= List of poetry collections =

The cover of T. S. Eliot's Prufrock and Other Observations, published in 1917, a collection of twelve poems including "The Love Song of J. Alfred Prufrock" referenced in the title

A poetry collection is often a compilation of several poems by one poet to be published in a single volume or chapbook. A collection can include any number of poems, ranging from a few (e.g. the four long poems in T. S. Eliot's Four Quartets) to several hundred poems (as is often seen in collections of haiku). Typically, the poems included in a single volume of poetry, or a cycle of poems, are linked by their style or thematic material. Most poets publish several volumes of poetry through the course of their lives, while other poets publish one (e.g. Walt Whitman's lifelong expansion of Leaves of Grass).

The notion of a "collection" differs in definition from volumes of a poet's "collected poems", "selected poems" or from a poetry anthology. Typically, a volume entitled "Collected Poems" is a compilation by a poet or an editor of a poet's work that is often both published and previously unpublished, drawn over a set span of years of the poet's work, or the entire poet's life, that represents a more complete or definitive edition of the poet's work. Comparatively, a volume titled "selected poems" often includes a small but not definitive selection of poems by a poet or editor drawn from several of the poet's collections. A poetry anthology differs in concept because it draws together works from multiple poets chosen by the anthology's editor.

== By title in alphabetical order ==
Because there is often confusion as to what constitutes a "collection", the list below only includes single volumes of poetry that were published at the direction of the author as a stand-alone collection and not any compiled editions of "collected works" or "selected works."

=== Titles: A–C ===
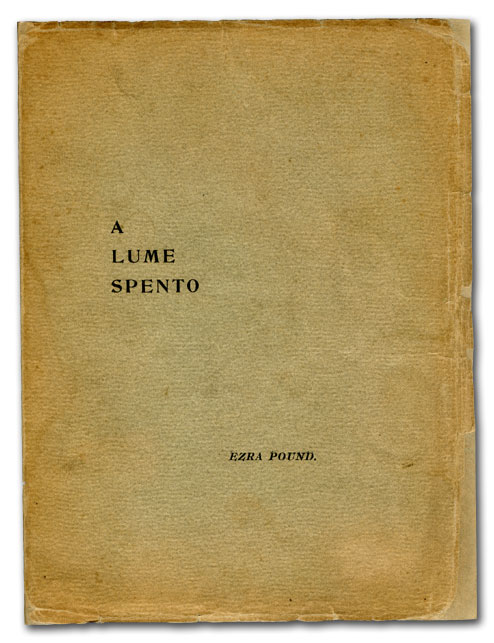
A Lume Spento, by Ezra Pound (1908)

- Abol Tabol (1923) - Sukumar Ray
- About the House (1965) - W.H. Auden
- Adam & Eve & The City (1936) - William Carlos Williams
- Adult Bookstore (1976) - Karl Shapiro
- Advent (1898) - Rainer Maria Rilke
- The Adventures of Tom Bombadil and Other Verses from the Red Book (1962) - J.R.R. Tolkien
- Aforesaid (1954) - Robert Frost
- Agnibeena - Kazi Nazrul Islam
- Al Que Quiere! (1917) - William Carlos Williams
- The Animal Family (1965) - Randall Jarrell
- Another Black Girl Miracle (2017) - Tonya Ingram
- Another Time (1940) - W.H. Auden
- Ariel - Sylvia Plath
- The Apprentice of Fever (1998) - Richard Tayson
- Arogyo - Rabindranath Tagore
- Auguries of Innocence - Patti Smith
- The Auroras of Autumn (1950) - Wallace Stevens
- Auto Wreck (1942) - Karl Shapiro
- Babel - Patti Smith
- Badmash Darpan (1895, collection of Bhojpuri Ghazals) - Teg Ali Teg
- Bairagi Kailaka Kabitaharu (1974) - Bairagi Kainla
- Bana-Phul - Rabindranath Tagore
- Basic Heart (2009) - Renée Ashley
- The Bat-Poet (1964) - Randall Jarrell
- Bhagna Hriday - Rabindranath Tagore
- Bhanusimha Thakurer Padabali - Rabindranath Tagore
- Blood for A Stranger (1942) - Randall Jarrell
- Book of Blues (1954–1961) - Jack Kerouac
- Book of Haikus (posthumous, 2003) - Jack Kerouac
- Book of Psalms
- Book of Sketches (1952–1957) - Jack Kerouac
- The Bourgeois Poet (1964) - Karl Shapiro
- A Boy's Will (1913) - Robert Frost
- The Broken Span (1941) - William Carlos Williams
- Buah Rindu (1941) – Amir Hamzah
- Das Buch der Bilder (trans. The Book of Images) (1902–1906) - Rainer Maria Rilke
- Cables to the Ace (1968) - Thomas Merton
- Caedmon manuscript
- Canzoni (1911) - Ezra Pound
- Canterbury Tales - Geoffrey Chaucer
- The Cantos - Ezra Pound
- Cathay (1915) - Ezra Pound
- Chaitali - Rabindranath Tagore
- Chhabi O Gan - Rabindranath Tagore
- Child Whispers (1922) - Enid Blyton
- Chills and Fever (1924) - John Crowe Ransom
- Chiryaa, Titli, Phool - Tanwir Phool
- Chitra - Rabindranath Tagore
- Circling: 1978-1987 (2012) (trans. of Krugovanje: 1978-1987, 1993) - Dejan Stojanović
- A City Winter and Other Poems (1951) - Frank O'Hara
- City Without Walls and Other Poems (1969) - W.H. Auden
- Clouds, Aigeltinger, Russia (1948) - William Carlos Williams
- The Cod Head (1932) - William Carlos Williams
- Coda: Last Poems (posthumous, 2008) - Karl Shapiro
- Collective Amnesia (2017) - Koleka Putuma
- Come In, and Other Poems (1943) - Robert Frost
- Contention of the bards (early 17th century)
- Cosmopolitan Greetings Poems: 1986–1993 (1994) - Allen Ginsberg
- The Countess Kathleen and Various Legends and Lyrics (1892) - W. B. Yeats
- The Creator (2012) (trans. of Tvoritelj, 2000) - Dejan Stojanović
- A Curious Collection of Cats (2009) - Betsy Franco
- The Cynic in Extremis (2018) - Jacob M. Appel

=== Titles: D–F ===
- Day by Day (1977) - Robert Lowell
- Death and Fame: Poems 1993–1997 (1999) - Allen Ginsberg
- The Desert Music and Other Poems (1954) - William Carlos Williams
- Dhanu Dnyaniyaachi (2016) - Dhanashree Ganatra
- Dictee (1982) - Theresa Hak Kyung Cha
- The Dolphin (1973) - Robert Lowell
- A Door Somewhere (2016) - Jaydeep Sarangi
- The Double Man (1941) - W.H. Auden
- Dramatic Lyrics - Robert Browning
- Dramatic Romances and Lyrics - Robert Browning
- Dramatis Personae - Robert Browning
- Duisener Elegien (trans. Duino Elegies) (1922) - Rainer Maria Rilke
- Dumb Instrument (1976) - Denton Welch
- An Early Martyr and Other Poems (1935) - William Carlos Williams
- Early Work - Patti Smith
- Eclogues (c. 37 BCE) - Virgil (Publius Vergilius Maro)
- Edda, Elder Edda
- Emblems of a Season of Fury (1963) - Thomas Merton
- Empire of Dreams (1988) - Giannina Braschi
- Empty Mirror: Early Poems (1961) - Allen Ginsberg
- Epistle to a Godson and Other Poems (1972) - W.H. Auden
- The Exeter Book
- Exultations (1909) - Ezra Pound
- The Fall of America: Poems of These States (1973) - Allen Ginsberg
- Feminine Gospels - Carol Ann Duffy (2002)
- First Blues: Rags, Ballads & Harmonium Songs 1971 - 1974 (1975) - Allen Ginsberg
- Les Fleurs du mal - Charles Baudelaire (1857)
- The Fly (1942) - Karl Shapiro
- Fly by Night (1976) - Randall Jarrell
- For the Time Being (1944) - W.H. Auden
- For the Union Dead (1964) - Robert Lowell
- Four Quartets (1943) - T. S. Eliot
- From Snow to Snow (1936) - Robert Frost
- A Further Range (1936) - Robert Frost

=== Titles: G–J ===
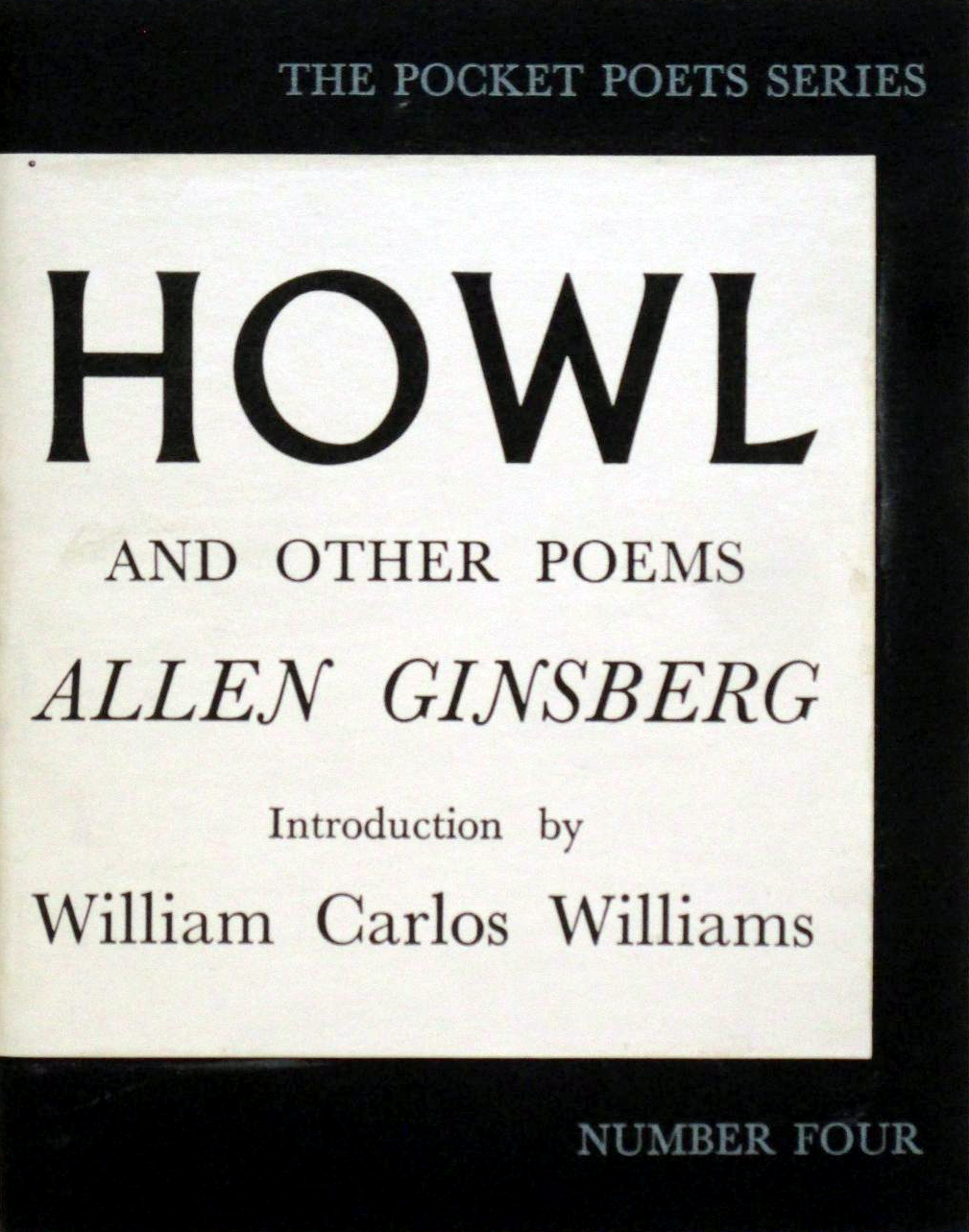
First edition cover of Howl and Other Poems (1956), by Allen Ginsberg

- The Gates of Wrath: Rhymed Poems 1948–1951 (1972) - Allen Ginsberg
- The Geography of Lograire (posthumous, 1969) - Thomas Merton
- Georgics (c. 29 BCE) - Virgil (Publius Vergilius Maro)
- Ghumne Mechmathi Andho Manche (1969) - Bhupi Sherchan
- The Gingerbread Rabbit (1965) - Randall Jarrell
- Gitabitan - Rabindranath Tagore
- Gitanjali (1910) - Rabindranath Tagore (also published in English as Song Offerings in 1912, for which Tagore received the Nobel Prize in 1913)
- Go Go (1923) - William Carlos Williams
- Goblin Market and Other Poems (1862) - Christina Rossetti
- The Gold Hesperidee (1935) - Robert Frost
- A Green Bough (1933) - William Faulkner
- Harmonium (1923) - Wallace Stevens
- Hazard and Prospect: New and Selected Poems (2007) - Kelly Cherry
- Heaven and Other Poems (posthumous, 1977) - Jack Kerouac
- His Toy, His Dream, His Rest (1968) - John Berryman
- Homage to Clio (1960) - W.H. Auden
- Homage to Sextus Propertius (1934) - Ezra Pound
- Homeric Hymns
- How to be Drawn (2015) - Terrance Hayes
- Howl and Other Poems (1956) - Allen Ginsberg
- i shimmer sometimes too (2019) - Porsha Olayiwola
- Ideas of Order (1936) - Wallace Stevens
- Idylls of the King - Alfred Tennyson
- Imaginations (posthumous, 1970) - William Carlos Williams
- Imitations (1961) - Robert Lowell
- In the Clearing (1962) - Robert Frost
- In the Seven Woods (1903) - W. B. Yeats
- Ink Knows No Borders: Poems of the Immigrant and Refugee Experience (2019) - Chrysanthemum Tran
- is 5 (1926) - E. E. Cummings
- Jeevanko Chheubaata (trans. From the Bank of Life) - Suman Pokhrel
- Journey to Love (1955) - William Carlos Williams
- Journey to a War (1939; verse and prose)

=== Titles: K–M ===
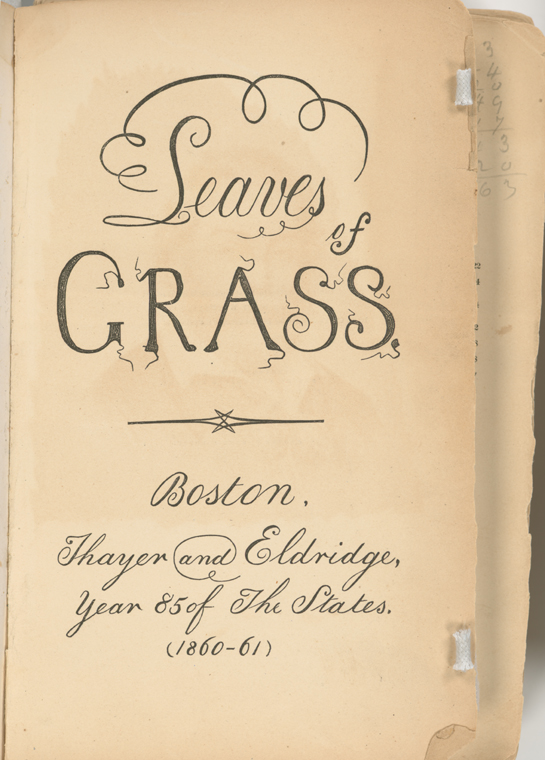
The cover page of the 1860-61 edition of Walt Whitman's Leaves of Grass printed by the Boston firm of Thayer and Eldridge

- Kabi-Kahini - Rabindranath Tagore
- Kaddish and Other Poems (1961) - Allen Ginsberg
- Kari o Komal - Rabindranath Tagore
- Khushbu - Parveen Shakir
- Das Knaben Wunderhorn
- Kytice (A Bouquet) - Karel Jaromír Erben
- Lamia, Isabella, The Eve of St Agnes and Other Poems (1820) - John Keats
- Land of Unlikeness (1944) - Robert Lowell
- Larenopfer (trans. Lares' Sacrifice) (1895) - Rainer Maria Rilke
- Leaves of Grass - Walt Whitman (1855–1891)
- Leben und Lieder (trans. Life and Songs) (1894) - Rainer Maria Rilke
- Letters from Iceland (1936, verse and prose) - W.H. Auden
- Life Studies (1959) - Robert Lowell
- Little Friend, Little Friend (1945) - Randall Jarrell
- The Lone Striker (1933) - Robert Frost
- Look, Stranger! (1936) - W.H. Auden
- Lord Weary's Castle (1946) - Robert Lowell
- Losses (1948) - Randall Jarrell
- The Lost World (1965) - Randall Jarrell
- lot of my sister (2001) - Alison Stine
- Love Poems (Tentative Title) (1965) - Frank O'Hara
- A Lume Spento (1908) - Ezra Pound
- Lunch Poems (1964) - Frank O'Hara
- Lustra (1916) - Ezra Pound
- Lyrical Ballads, with a Few Other Poems (1798) - William Wordsworth and Samuel Taylor Coleridge
- Main Street and Other Poems (1917) - Joyce Kilmer
- A Man in the Divided Sea (1946) - Thomas Merton
- The Man with the Blue Guitar (1937) - Wallace Stevens
- Manasi - Rabindranath Tagore
- The Marble Faun (1924) - William Faulkner
- The Marriage of Heaven and Hell - William Blake 1790–1793
- The Mayfield Deer (1941) - Mark Van Doren
- Meditations in an Emergency (1957) - Frank O'Hara
- Men and Women - Robert Browning
- Mexico City Blues (1959) - Jack Kerouac
- Michael Robartes and the Dancer (1921) - W. B. Yeats
- The Mills of The Kavanaughs (1951) - Robert Lowell
- Mind Breaths (1978) - Allen Ginsberg
- Mississippi Poems (posthumous, 1979) - William Faulkner
- Mohan Koiralaka Kavita (1973) - Mohan Koirala
- Monks Pond: No. 1, 1968 (1968) - Thomas Merton
- Monokuma's Poetry Collection (2012) - Monokuma
- Monolithos - Jack Gilbert
- Mother Goose (generic for collections of nursery rhymes)
- Mountain Interval (1916) - Robert Frost
- Muna Madan - Laxmi Prasad Devkota
- The Museum of Lost Wings (2006) - Renée Ashley
- My Facebook Wall (2016) - Dhanashree Ganatra
- My Life (1980) - Lyn Hejinian
- My Mother Was A Freedom Fighter (2017) - Aja Monet

=== Titles: N–P ===
- Nadi - Rabindranath Tagore
- Near the Ocean (1967) - Robert Lowell
- Neue Gedichte (trans. New Poems) (1907) - Rainer Maria Rilke
- New Hampshire (1923) - Robert Frost
- No Thanks (1935) - E. E. Cummings
- Nones (1951) - W.H. Auden
- North of Boston (1914) - Robert Frost
- Nyanyi Sunyi (1937) - Amir Hamzah
- Odes (1960) - Frank O'Hara
- Ohio Violence (2009) - Alison Stine
- Old Angel Midnight (posthumous, 1973) - Jack Kerouac
- The Old Horsefly (1993) - Karl Shapiro
- Old Possum's Book of Practical Cats (1939) - T. S. Eliot
- Olney Hymns
- Opus Posthumous (posthumous, 1957) - Wallace Stevens
- Oranges: 12 pastorals (1953) - Frank O'Hara
- The Orators: An English Study (1932, verse and prose) - W.H. Auden
- Our Lady Peace - Mark Van Doren
- Owl's Clover (1936) - Wallace Stevens
- The Palm at the End of the Mind (posthumous, 1972) - Wallace Stevens
- Parts of a World (1942) - Wallace Stevens
- Paulicéia Desvairada (trans. Untapped São Paulo or Hallucinated City) (1922) - Mário de Andrade
- Person, Place, and Thing (1942) - Karl Shapiro
- Personae (1908) - Ezra Pound
- Pictures from Brueghel and Other Poems (1962) - William Carlos Williams
- Pierrot Lunaire - Albert Giraud
- The Pisan Cantos (1948) - Ezra Pound
- The Place of Love (1943) - Karl Shapiro
- Plutonian Ode: Poems 1977–1980 (1981) - Allen Ginsberg
- Poems (1930) - W.H. Auden
- Poems (1920) - T.S. Eliot
- Poems (1920) - Wilfred Owen
- Poems (1833) - Alfred, Lord Tennyson
- Poems (1842) - Alfred, Lord Tennyson
- Poems (1909) - William Carlos Williams
- Poems about God (1919) - John Crowe Ransom
- Poems All Sizes (posthumous, 1992) - Jack Kerouac
- Poems, Chiefly Lyrical (1830) - Alfred, Lord Tennyson
- Poems, in Two Volumes (1807) - William Wordsworth
- Poems of a Jew (1950) - Karl Shapiro
- Prabhat Samgiita (5018 songs) - Prabhat Ranjan Sarkar
- Prabhat Sangeet - Rabindranath Tagore
- The Princess: A Medley (1847) - Alfred, Lord Tennyson
- Provenca (1910) - Ezra Pound
- Prufrock and Other Observations (1917) - T.S. Eliot

=== Titles: Q–S ===
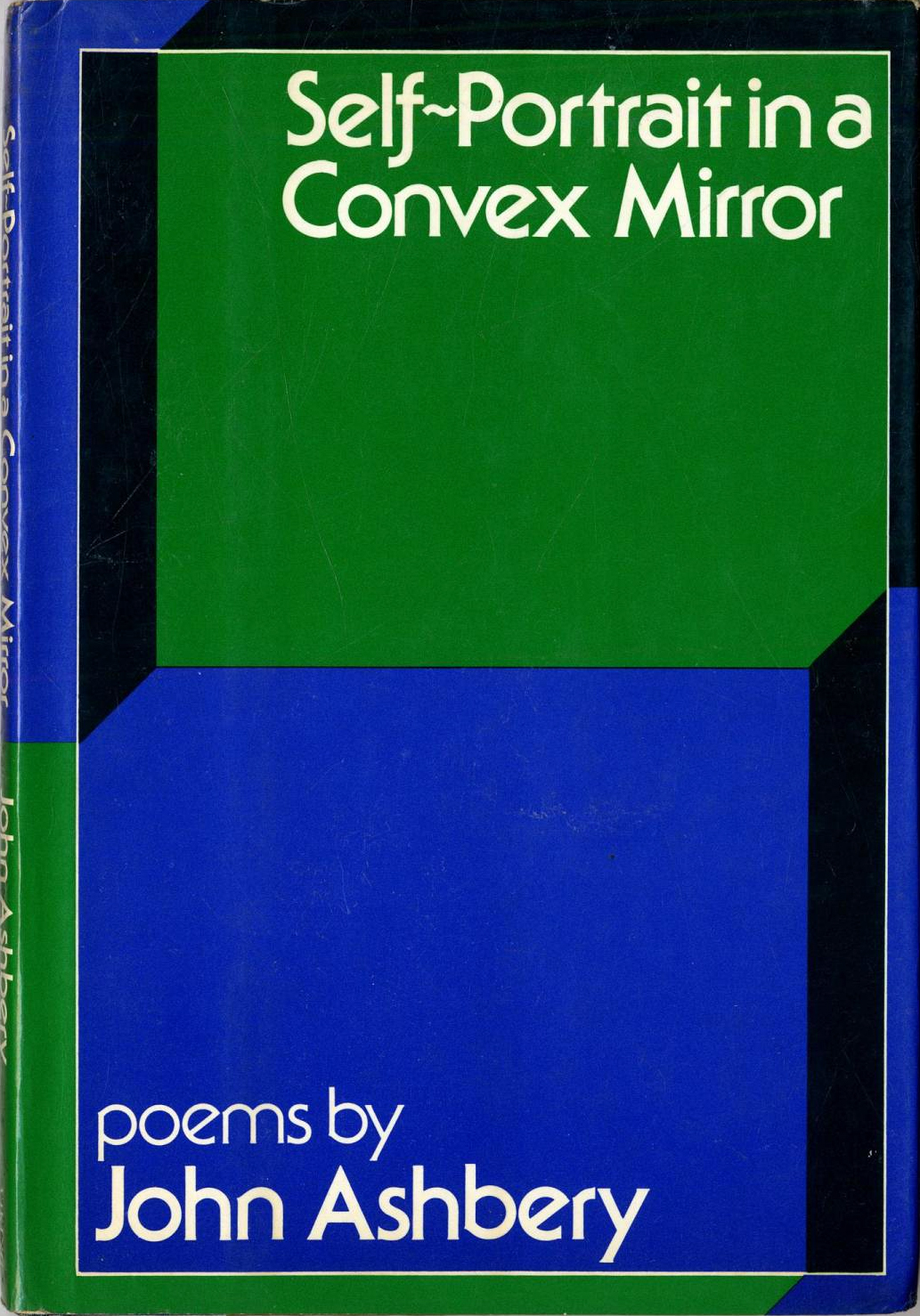
First edition of Self-portrait in a Convex Mirror (1975), by John Ashbery

- Quia Pauper Amavi (1908) - Ezra Pound
- A Quinzaine for This Yule (1908) - Ezra Pound
- Ramprasadi (devotional songs) - Ramprasad Sen
- A Remembrance Collection of New Poems (1959) - Robert Frost
- The Revisionist's Dream (2001) - Renée Ashley
- Ripostes (1912) - Ezra Pound
- Rubaiyat - Omar Khayyám (trans. Edward Fitzgerald)
- Sad Dust Glories: poems during work summer in woods (1975) - Allen Ginsberg
- Sagarmatha Ko Gahirai (2017) - Nawaraj Parajuli
- Salt (1992) - Renée Ashley
- San Francisco Blues (posthumous, 1991) - Jack Kerouac
- Sandhya Sangeet - Rabindranath Tagore
- Scattered Poems (posthumous, 1971) - Jack Kerouac
- The Scripture of the Golden Eternity (1960) - Jack Kerouac
- Second Avenue (1960) - Frank O'Hara
- Self-portrait in a Convex Mirror (1975) - John Ashbery
- The Seven League Crutches (1951) - Randall Jarrell
- The Seven Seas (1896) - Rudyard Kipling
- Seventh Heaven - Patti Smith
- Shaishab Sangeet - Rabindranath Tagore
- The Shape (2012) (trans. of Oblik, 2000) - Dejan Stojanović
- Shards of Crystal - Fern G. Z. Carr
- The Shield of Achilles (1955) - W.H. Auden
- A Shropshire Lad - A. E. Housman
- The Sign and Its Children (2012) (trans. of Znak i njegova deca, 2000) - Dejan Stojanović
- The Singing Bowl (Norwich: Canterbury Press, 2013) - Malcolm Guite ISBN 978-1848255418
- Silent Days (Cyberwit.net,2013) - Jaydeep Sarangi
- Skirrid Hill - Owen Sheers (2006)
- The Snow Man (1921) - Wallace Stevens
- Sonar Tari - Rabindranath Tagore
- Sonette an Orpheus (trans. Sonnets to Orpheus) (1922) - Rainer Maria Rilke
- Songs of Experience - William Blake
- Songs of Innocence - William Blake
- Sonnets from the Portuguese - Elizabeth Barrett Browning
- Sounding the Seasons: Seventy Sonnets for Christian Year (Norwich: Canterbury Press, 2012) - Malcolm Guite ISBN 978-1848252745
- Sour Grapes (1921) - William Carlos Williams
- Spring and All (1923) - William Carlos Williams
- Spring Thunder (1924) - Mark Van Doren
- State of Love and Trust - W.K. Lawrence
- Steeple Bush (1947) - Robert Frost
- The Story-Teller - Mark Van Doren
- The Strange Islands: Poems (1957) - Thomas Merton\
- Das Stunden-Buch (trans. The Book of Hours) (1899–1903) - Rainer Maria Rilke
- Summer of Love (1911) - Joyce Kilmer
- Svipdagsmál (Old Norse)

=== Titles: T–V ===
- Tamerlane and Other Poems - Edgar Allan Poe
- The Tears of the Blind Lions (1949) - Thomas Merton
- The Tempers (1913) - William Carlos Williams
- Thank You, Fog: Last Poems (1974) - W.H. Auden
- Thirty Poems (1944) - Thomas Merton
- Three Stories and Ten Poems - Ernest Hemingway
- To Square A Circle (2018) - T. K. Lee
- The Tower (1928) - W. B. Yeats
- Transport to Summer (1947) - Wallace Stevens
- Traumgekrönt (trans. Dream-Crowned) (1897) - Rainer Maria Rilke
- Trees and Other Poems (1914) - Joyce Kilmer
- Trial of a Poet (1947) - Karl Shapiro
- Tulips and Chimneys (1923) - E. E. Cummings
- Two Gentlemen in Bonds (1927) - John Crowe Ransom
- Umbra (1920) - Ezra Pound
- V-Letter and Other Poems (1945) - Karl Shapiro
- The Various Reason of Light (1998) - Renée Ashley
- The Verbs of Desiring (2010) - Renée Ashley
- Vision in Spring (1921) - William Faulkner
- ViVa (1931) - E. E. Cummings

=== Titles: W–Z ===
- WAIT (2011) - Alison Stine
- The Wanderings of Oisin and Other Poems - W. B. Yeats (1889)
- The Wedge (1944) - William Carlos Williams
- West-Running Brook (1929) - Robert Frost
- White Haired Lover (1968) - Karl Shapiro
- White Shroud Poems: 1980–1985 (1986) - Allen Ginsberg
- The Wild Swans at Coole (1919) - W. B. Yeats
- The Winding Stair and Other Poems (1933) - W. B. Yeats
- Winter Diary (1935) - Mark Van Doren
- A Witness Tree (1942) - Robert Frost
- Witt - Patti Smith
- The Woman at the Washington Zoo: Poems and Translations (1960) - Randall Jarrell
- XAIPE: Seventy-One Poems (1950) - E. E. Cummings
- XLI Poems (1925) - E. E. Cummings
- You Come Too (1959) - Robert Frost

=== Titles beginning with numbers ===
- 1 × 1 (1944) - E. E. Cummings
- 50 Poems (1940) - E. E. Cummings
- 73 Poems (1963) - E. E. Cummings (posthumous)
- 77 Dream Songs (1964) - John Berryman
- 95 Poems (1958) - E. E. Cummings
- 108 Verges Until Now - Will Inman (Carlton Press, 1964)

=== Titles beginning with symbols ===
- & (1925) - E. E. Cummings
- ... E Poe sia (2019) - Davide Roccamo

== See also ==
- Anthology
- Glossary of poetry terms
- History of poetry
- List of anonymously published works
- List of poems
- List of poetry anthologies
- List of poetry groups and movements
- List of years in literature
- List of years in poetry
- Lists of books
- Lists of poets
- Outline of poetry
- The Poetry Collection, a collection of 100,000 volumes of 20th century English-language poetry at the University of Buffalo
- Song cycle
