= 2012 in poetry =

Nationality words link to articles with information on the nation's poetry or literature (for instance, Irish or France).

== Events ==
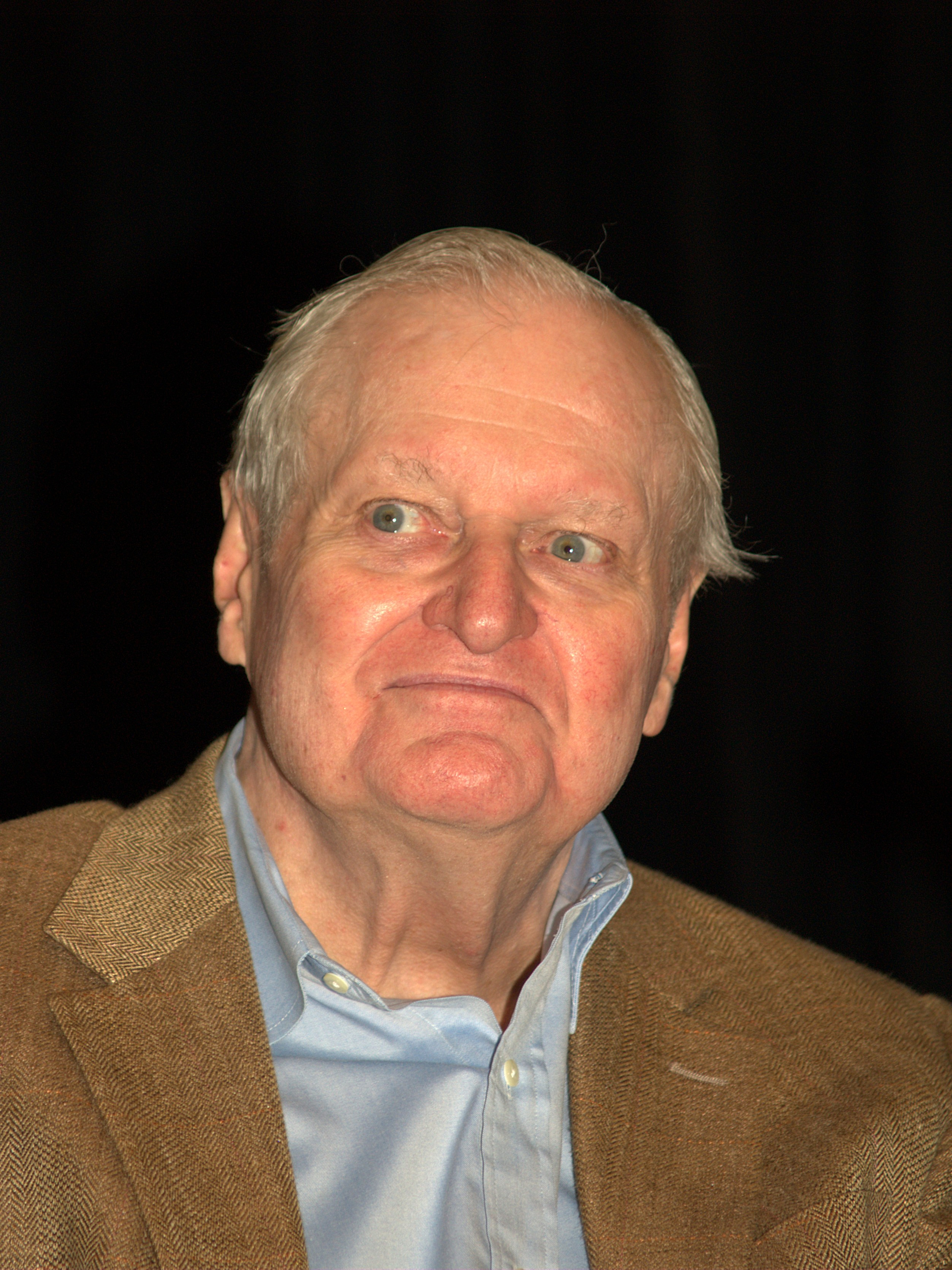
John Ashbery at the 2010 Brooklyn Book Festival

- January 31 – A Chinese court sentences poet and political dissident Zhu Yufu to a seven-year prison term for "inciting subversion of state power". During Yufu's trial hearing, prosecutors have cited a poem and messages he had sent on the internet.
- February 13 – In a ceremony at the White House, John Ashbery is awarded the National Humanities Medal and Rita Dove awarded the National Medal of Arts. The honors are bestowed to 15 artists in all by President Barack Obama.

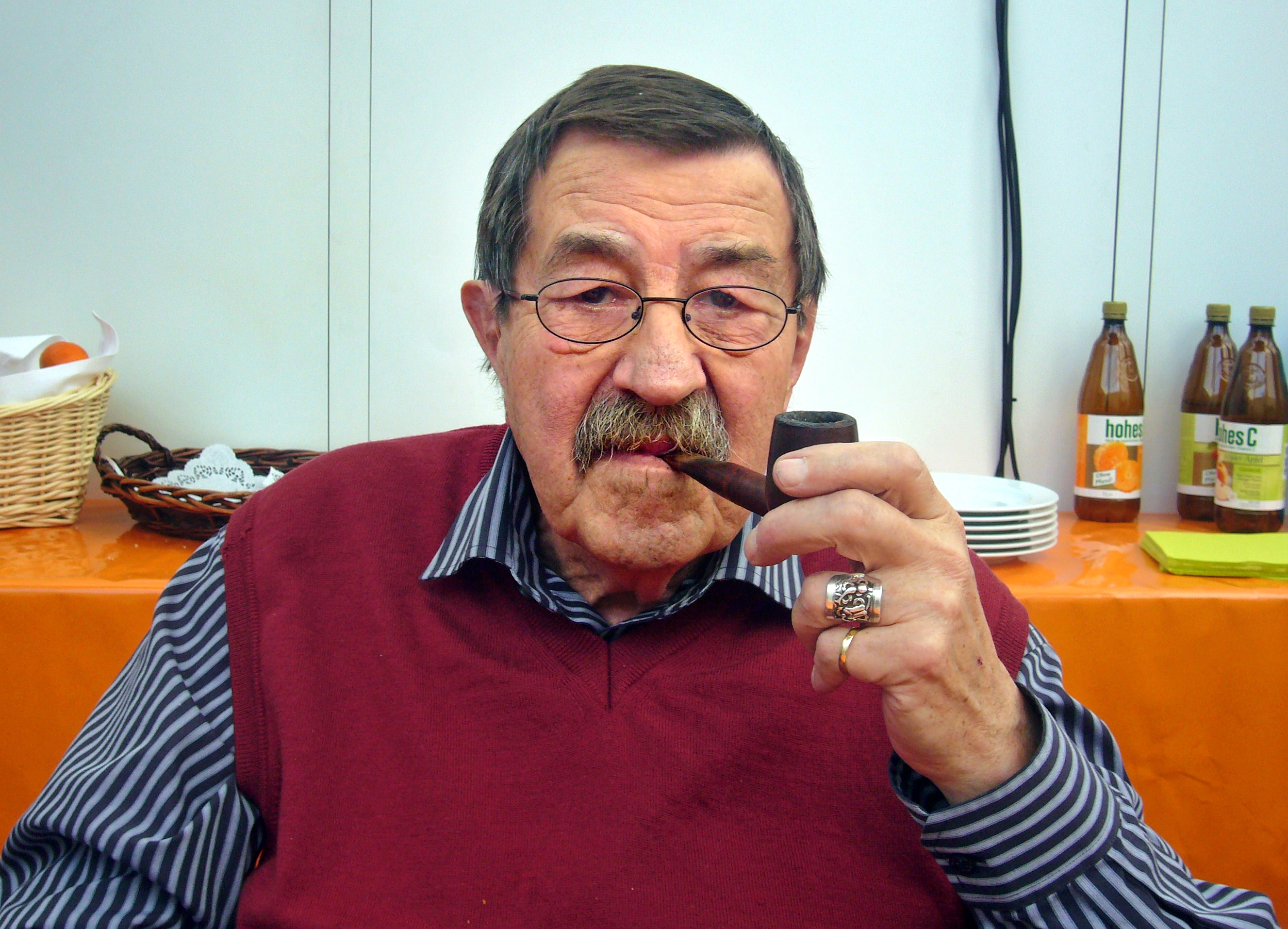
Günter Grass in 2010

- April 4 – Günter Grass's poem "What Must Be Said" is first published. Four days later, Eli Yishai, the Israeli Minister for the Interior, declares Grass persona non grata.
- June 7 – Natasha Trethewey is chosen by the Library of Congress to be the 19th U.S. Poet Laureate.
- November 29 – A Qatari poet, Muhammad Ibn al-Dheeb al-Ajami, age 36, is sentenced to life imprisonment for "comments said to be critical of the Qatari leadership," and "attempts to destabilise the country." In February 2013, his sentence is reduced to 15 years in prison.
- Poetry of the Taliban, an anthology translated from Pashto, is published in English.

== Works published in English ==
=== Australia ===
- Brook Emery - Collusion (John Leonard Press) ISBN 978-0-9808-5236-3
- Les Wicks - Barking Wings (PressPress)

=== Canada ===
- Barry McKinnon, Into the Blind World, above/ground press,
- rob mclennan, Sextet: six poems from Songs for little sleep, above/ground press,
- Lisa Robertson, Nilling: Prose, Toronto: BookThug
- Robert Bringhurst, Selected Poems, Copper Canyon Press,

=== New Zealand ===
- Helen Heath, Graft, Victoria University Press

==== Poets in Best New Zealand Poems ====
Poems from these 25 poets were selected by Bernadette Hall for Best New Zealand Poems 2011, published online this year:

- John Adams
- Tusiata Avia
- Hera Lindsay Bird
- Peter Bland
- Rachel Bush
- Zarah Butcher-McGunnigle
- Joan Fleming
- Janis Freegard
- Rhian Gallagher
- Rob Hack
- Dinah Hawken
- Anna Jackson
- Brent Kininmont
- Michele Leggott
- Helen Lehndorf
- Kate McKinstry
- Bill Manhire
- Harvey Molloy
- James Norcliffe
- Rachel O'Neill
- Marty Smith
- Rānui Taiapa
- Tim Upperton
- Louise Wallace
- Douglas Write

=== United Kingdom ===
- Sean Borodale, Bee Journal, Jonathan Cape
- Basil Bunting, Bunting's Persia: Translations by Basil Bunting, edited by Don Share, Flood Editions
- Ben Parker, The Escape Artists, Tall Lighthouse
- Andy Croft, Nineteen Forty-Eight, Five Leaves
- Kathleen Jamie, The Overhaul, Scottish poet
- Ralph Pordzik, Night Passage Across the Sea. A Dramatic Duologue, International Poetry Editions
- Robert Sheppard, The Only Life, Knives Forks & Spoons, Le Willows
- Dennis B. Wilson, Elegy of a Common Soldier, and Other Poems, Kultura

=== United States ===
- Paige Ackerson-Kiely – My Love is a Dead Arctic Explorer, 128 pages, Ahsahta Press, ISBN 9781934103272
- John Allman, Algorithms, Clear Sound / Quale Press, Niantic, CT
- Kris Bigalk – Repeat the Flesh in Numbers, NYQ Books,
- Richard Blanco, Looking for the Gulf Motel, University of Pittsburgh Press,
- Marilyn Buck – Inside/Out: Selected Poems, foreword by David Meltzer, City Lights Books
- Joseph Campana – Natural Selections, Iowa
- Jared Carter – A Dance in the Street, 112 pages, Wind Publications, ISBN 9781936138272.
- Heather Christle – What Is Amazing, Wesleyan,
- Laura Cronk – Having Been an Accomplice: Poems, Persea Books
- Michael Collier – An Individual History: Poems, W. W. Norton,
- Martha Collins – White Papers, University of Pittsburgh Press,
- CA Conrad – A Beautiful Marsupial Afternoon: New (Soma)tics, 240 pages, Wave Press, ISBN 9781933517599
- Eduardo C. Corral – Slow Lightning, Yale University Press,
- Brent Cunningham – Journey to the Sun, 120 pages, Atelos, ISBN 9781891190353
- Jazzy Danziger – Darkroom, University of Wisconsin Press, ISBN 9780299286842
- Natalie Diaz – When My Brother Was an Aztec, Copper Canyon Press, ISBN 9781556593833
- Matthew and Michael Dickman – 50 American plays: poems, Copper Canyon Press
- Joseph Donahue – Dissolves (Terra Lucida IV-VIII), 160 pages, Talisman House Publishers, ISBN 9781584980780
- Thom Donovan – The Hole, 163 pages, Displaced Press, ISBN 9780982212073
- Norman Fischer – Conflict, 84 pages, Chax Press, ISBN 9780925904720
- Jack Gilbert – Collected Poems, Knopf,
- Nathalie Handal – Poet in Andalucía, University of Pittsburgh Press,
- Lyn Hejinian – The Book of a Thousand Eyes, 350 pages, Omnidawn Publishing, ISBN 9781890650575
- Sørina Higgins – Caduceus, 100 pages, Word Tech Communications / David Robert Books, ISBN 9781936370610
- Cathy Park Hong – Engine Empire, Norton
- Paul Hoover – Desolation: Souvenir, 96 pages, Omnidawn Publishing, ISBN 9781890650582
- Mitch Cullin – The House of Special Purpose, illustrated by Peter I. Chang
- Alice Jones – Plunge, Apogee Press
- Lenore Kandel – Collected Poems of Lenore Kandel, North Atlantic Books
- James Browning Kepple Thus Virginia Passes Pretend Genius Press ISBN 9780985213329
- Rebecca Lindenberg – Love, An Index, McSweeney's
- Liu Xiaobo – June Fourth Elegies; trans. from the Chinese by Jeffrey Yang, Graywolf Press,
- Magus Magnus - The Re-echoes, 99 pages, Furniture Press Books ISBN 9780982629970
- Sean Labrador Y Manzano, The Gulag Arkipelago, Tinfish Press
- Filip Marinovich, And if You Don’t Go Crazy, I’ll Meet You Here Tomorrow, Ugly Duckling Press,
- Campbell McGrath – In the Kingdom of the Sea Monkeys: Poems, Ecco
- Joyelle McSweeney – Percussion Grenade: Poems & Plays, 96 pages, Fence Books, ISBN 9781934200520
- Rusty Morrison – After Urgency, 88 pages, Tupelo Press, ISBN 9781932195415
- David Mutschlecner – Enigma and Light, Ahsahta Press,
- Eileen Myles – Snowflake; Different Streets, Wave Press

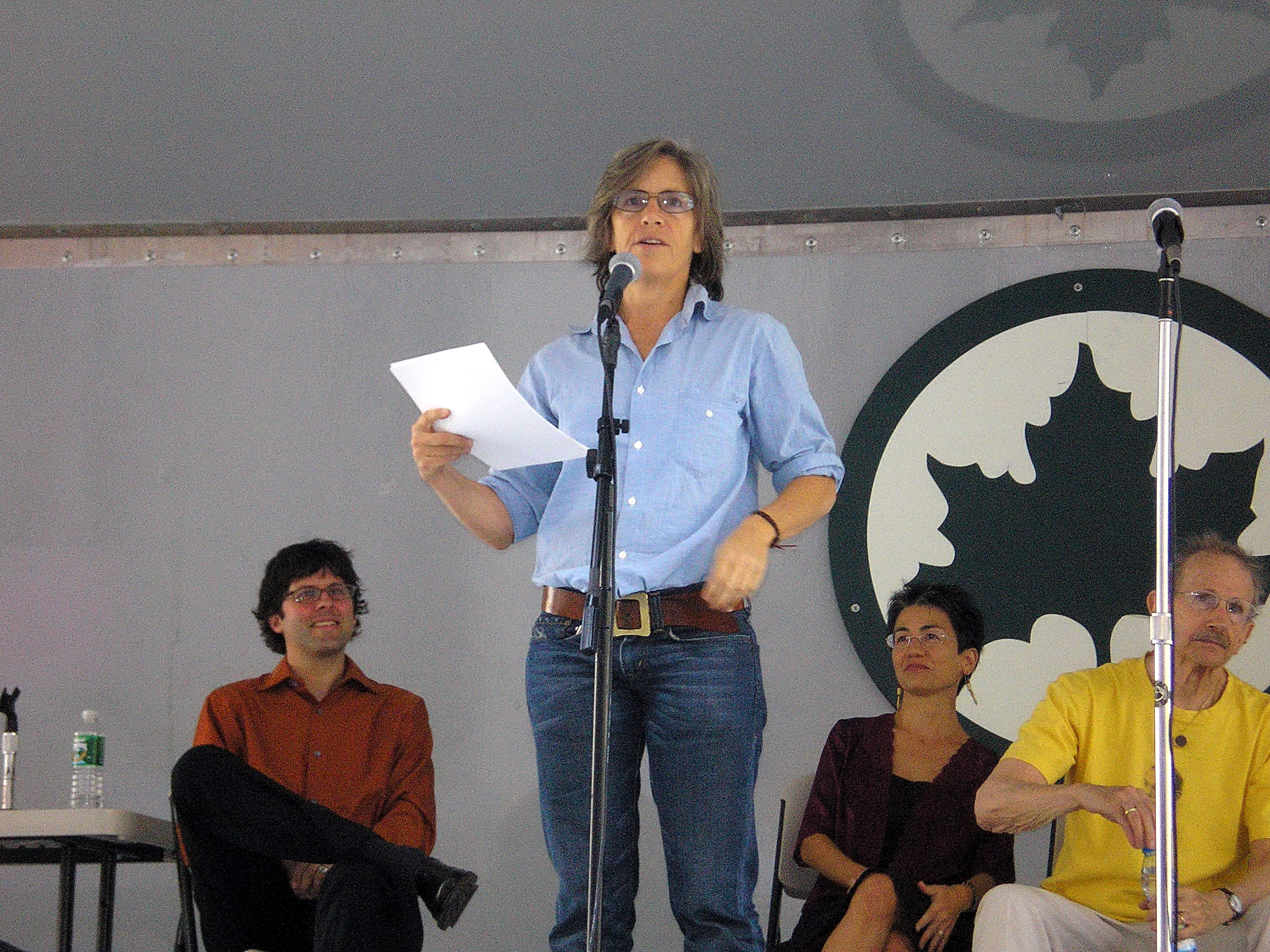
Eileen Myles reading in NYC, September 2006

- Kelli Anne Noftle – I Was There for Your Somniloquy, 72 pages, Omnidawn Publishing, ISBN 9781890650599
- Travis Ortiz – variously, not then, Tuumba Press,
- G.M. Palmer – With Rough Gods, Jagged Door Press, ISBN 9780982387818
- Carlo Parcelli – The Canaanite Gospel: A Meditation on Empire: 88 Monologues, Country Valley Press / Flashpøint,
- Lucia Perillo – On the Spectrum of Possible Deaths, Copper Canyon Press
- Stanley Plumly – Orphan Hours: Poems, W. W. Norton,
- D. A. Powell – Useless Landscape, or a Guide for Boys, Graywolf Press,
- Bin Ramke – Aerial, 136 pages, Omnidawn Publishing, ISBN 9781890650605
- Paisley Rekdal – Animal Eye, University of Pittsburgh Press,
- Michael Ryan – This Morning, Houghton Mifflin Harcourt,
- David St. John – The Auroras: New Poems, Harper,
- Tomaz Salamun – On the Tracks of Wild Game, 108 pages, Ugly Duckling Presse, ISBN 9781933254951
- Mark Scroggins – Red Arcadia, 80 pages, Shearsman Books, ISBN 9781848611924
- W.G. Sebald – Across the Land and the Water: Selected Poems 1964–2001, Random House,
- Jane Shore – That Said: New and Selected Poems, Houghton Mifflin Harcourt
- Jared Smith – The Collected Poems of Jared Smith: 1971–2011, 600 pages, NYQ Books, ISBN 9781935520511
- A.E. Stallings – Olives, TriQuarterly
- Jordan Stempleman – No, Not Today, 72 pages, Magic Helicopter Press, ISBN 9780984140633
- Dejan Stojanović - Circling: 1978-1987; translated from the Serbian by Dejan Stojanović, ebook, New Avenue Books
- Dejan Stojanović - The Creator; translated from the Serbian by Dejan Stojanović, ebook, New Avenue Books
- Dejan Stojanović - The Shape; translated from the Serbian by Dejan Stojanović, ebook, New Avenue Books
- Dejan Stojanović - The Sign and Its Children; translated from the Serbian by Dejan Stojanović, ebook, New Avenue Books
- Cole Swensen – Gravesend, University of California Press,
- Stacy Szymaszek- Austerity Measures, Fewer & Further Press, Wendell, MA
- James Tate – The Eternal Ones of the Dream: Selected Poems 1990–2010, Ecco,
- Rodrigo Toscano – Deck of Deeds, 128 pages, Counterpath Press, ISBN 9781933996318
- Ko Un – This Side of Time: Poems by Ko Un (translated from the Korean by Clare You and Richard Silberg), 128 pages, White Pine Press, ISBN 9781935210320
- Chris Vitiello, Obedience, 98 pages, Ahsahta Press, ISBN 9781934103265
- David Wagoner – After the Point of No Return, Copper Canyon Press,
- Lew Welch – Ring of Bone: Collected Poems, City Lights Books,
- Marjorie Welish – In the Futurity Lounge / Asylum for Indeterminacy, 112 pages, Coffee House Press, ISBN 9781566893022
- William L. Wright – Guardian of the Inkwell, 365 pages, ISBN 9781300466376
- Gary Young – Even So: New and Selected Poems, 229 pages, White Pine Press, ISBN 9781935210337

==== Anthologies in the United States ====
- Peter Cole and Aminadav Dykman, editors. Poetry of Kabbalah: Mystical Verse from the Jewish Tradition, Yale University Press,
- Ryan G. Van Cleave, editor. City of the Big Shoulders: An Anthology of Chicago Poetry, Iowa, . Includes: Rane Arroyo, Marvin Bell, Allen Braden, John Bradley, Curtis L. Crisler, Mary Cross, James D’Agostino, Stuart Dybek, Susan Elbe, Dina Elenbogen, Martín Espada, Beth Ann Fennelly, Bob Hicok, Edward Hirsch, Philip Jenks & Simone Muench, Thomas L. Johnson, Quraysh Ali Lansana, Viola Lee, Francesco Levato, Campbell McGrath, Paul Martínez Pompa, Adrian Matejka, Erika Mikkalo, Julie Parson Nesbitt, Johanny Vázquez Paz, James Plath, Christina Pugh, Maya Quintero, Robyn Schiff, Patricia Smith, Tony Trigilio, Alpay Ulku, Judith Valente, Nicole Walker, Ellen Wehle, Brenda Yates
- Cary Nelson, editor. The Oxford Handbook of Modern and Contemporary American Poetry, Oxford University Press, . Includes essays by Rachel Blau DuPlessis, Robert Dale Parker, Melissa Girard, John Marsh, Linda A. Kinnahan, Peter Nicholls, Charles Altieri, Edward Brunner, Tim Newcomb, Susan Rosenbaum, Mike Chasar, Philip Metres, Karen Jackson Ford, Josephine Park, Walter Kalaidjian, Jahan Ramazani, Michael Thurston, Al Filreis, Lytle Shaw, Mark W. Van Wienen, Michael Davidson, Lynn Keller, Timothy Yu, James Smethurst, Adalaide Morris
- Charles Henry Rowell, editor. Angles of Ascent: A Norton Anthology of Contemporary African American Poetry, W.W. Norton, .More than 70 poets are represented in this anthology of African-American poetry since the 1960s
- Joshua Corey and G.C. Waldrep, editors – The Arcadia Project: North American Postmodern Pastoral, Ahsahta Press. – Contributors: Emily Abendroth, Will Alexander, Rae Armantrout, Eric Baus, Dan Beachy-Quick, John Beer, Mei-mei Berssenbrugge, Sherwin Bitsui, Kamau Brathwaite, Susan Briante, Oni Buchanan, Heather Christle, Stephen Collis, Jack Collom, Phil Cordelli, T. Zachary Cotler, Brent Cunningham, Christopher Dewdney, Timothy Donnelly, Michael Dumanis, Camille Dungy, Marcella Durand, Lisa Fishman, Rob Fitterman, Forrest Gander, Merrill Gilfillan, C. S. Giscombe, Peter Gizzi, Jody Gladding, Johannes Göransson, Chris Green, Arielle Greenberg, Richard Greenfield, Sarah Gridley, e. tracy grinnell, Gabriel Gudding, Joshua Harmon, Nathan Hauke, Lyn Hejinian, Mary Hickman, Brenda Hillman, Kevin Holden, Paul Hoover, Erika Howsare & Kate Schapira, Brenda Iijima, Sally Keith, Karla Kelsey, Amy King, Melissa Kwasny, Brian Laidlaw, Maryrose Larkin, Ann Lauterbach, Karen An-hwei Lee, Paul Legault, Sylvia Legris, Dana Levin, Eric Linsker, Alessandra Lynch, J. Michael Martinez, Nicole Mauro, Aaron McCollough, Joyelle McSweeney, K. Silem Mohammad, Laura Moriarty, Rusty Morrison, Erin Mouré, Jennifer Moxley, Laura Mullen, Melanie Noel, Kathryn Nuernberger, Peter O'Leary, Patrick Pritchett, Bin Ramke, Stephen Ratcliffe, Matt Reeck, Marthe Reed, Evelyn Reilly, Karen Rigby, Ed Roberson, Lisa Robertson, Elizabeth Robinson, Craig Santos Perez, Leslie Scalapino, Standard Schaefer, Brandon Shimoda, Eleni Sikelianos, Jonathan Skinner, Gustaf Sobin, Juliana Spahr, Jane Sprague, Fenn Stewart, Adam Strauss, Mathias Svalina, Arthur Sze, John Taggart, Michelle Taransky, Brian Teare, Tony Tost, Jasmine Dreame Wagner, Cathy Wagner, Elizabeth Willis, Jane Wong, and C. D. Wright

==== Nonfiction, criticism, scholarship and biography in the United States ====
- Dan Beachy-Quick - Wonderful Investigations: Essays, Meditations, Tales, Milkweed Editions
- Rachel Blau DuPlessis – Purple Passages: Pound, Eliot, Zukofsky, Olson, Creeley and the Ends of Patriarchal Poetry, University of Iowa Press.
- Lisa Jarnot – Robert Duncan: The Ambassador from Venus: A Biography, University of California Press.
- Kenneth Rexroth – In the Sierra: Mountain Writings, New Directions Publishing.
- Dale M Smith – Poets Beyond the Barricade: Rhetoric, Citizenship, and Dissent after 1960, University of Alabama Press.
- John Yau – Further Adventures in Monochrome, Copper Canyon Press.

==== Poets in The Best American Poetry 2012 ====
The following poets appeared in The Best American Poetry 2012. David Lehman, general editor, and Mark Doty, guest editor (who selected the poetry):

- Sherman Alexie
- Karen Leona Anderson
- Rae Armantrout
- Julianna Baggot
- David Baker
- Rick Barot
- Reginald Dwayne Betts
- Frank Bidart
- Bruce Bond
- Stephanie Brown
- Anne Carson
- Jennifer Chang
- Joseph Chapman
- Heather Christle
- Henri Cole
- Billy Collins
- Peter Cooley
- Eduardo C. Corral
- Erica Dawson
- Stephen Dunn
- Elaine Equi
- Robert Gibb
- Kathleen Graber
- Amy Glynn Greacen
- James Allen Hall
- Terrance Hayes
- Steven Heighton
- Brenda Hillman
- Jane Hirshfield
- Richard Howard
- Marie Howe
- Amorak Huey
- Jenny Johnson
- Lawrence Joseph
- Fady Joudah
- Joy Katz
- James Kimbrell
- Noelle Kocot
- Maxine Kumin
- Sarah Lindsay
- Amit Majmudar
- David Mason
- Kerrin McCadden
- Honor Moore
- Michael Morse
- Carol Muske-Dukes
- Angelo Nikolopoulos
- Mary Oliver
- Steve Orlen
- Alicia Ostriker
- Eric Pankey
- Lucia Perillo
- Robert Pinsky
- Dean Rader
- Spencer Reece
- Paisley Rekdal
- Mary Ruefle
- Don Russ
- Kay Ryan
- Mary Jo Salter
- Lynne Sharon Schwartz
- Frederick Seidel
- Brenda Shaughnessy
- Peter Jay Shippy
- Tracy K. Smith
- Bruce Snider
- Mark Strand
- Larissa Szporluk
- Daniel Tobin
- Natasha Trethewey
- Susan Wheeler
- Franz Wright
- David Yezzi
- Dean Young
- Kevin Young

== Works published in other languages ==
=== Poland ===
- Jerzy Jarniewicz – Na dzień dzisiejszy i chwilę obecną (Biuro Literackie)
- Jerzy Kronhold – Epitafium dla Lucy (Zeszyty Literackie)
- Piotr Matywiecki – Widownia (Wydawnictwo Literackie)
- Anna Piwkowska – Lustrzanka (Zeszyty Literackie)
- Krystyna Rodowska – Wiersze przesiane 1968–2011 (Podkarpacki Instytut Książki i Marketingu)

=== Other languages ===
Bengali :

- Rahman Henry – Brojosundoeer Kotha (February 2012) Collection of Poems.
- Rahman Henry – Kobitar Tribhuban (February 2012) a collection of Translated poems.×

Ukrainian :

Urdu

- Mehr Lal Soni Zia Fatehabadi – The Qat'aat o Rubaiyat of Zia Fatehabadi (May 2012) with translation from Urdu to English in free verse.

== Awards and honors by country ==
Awards announced this year:

=== Canada awards and honors ===
- Archibald Lampman Award: Michael Blouin, Wore Down Trust
- Atlantic Poetry Prize: Susan Goyette, Outskirts
- 2012 Governor General's Awards: Julie Bruck, Monkey Ranch (English); Maude Smith Gagnon, Un drap. Une place. (French)
- Griffin Poetry Prize:
  - Canadian: Ken Babstock, Methodist Hatchet
  - International, in the English Language: David Harsent, Night
  - Lifetime Recognition Award: Seamus Heaney
- Gerald Lampert Award: Sarah Yi-Mei Tsiang, Sweet Devilry
- Pat Lowther Award: Susan Goyette, Outskirts
- Prix Alain-Grandbois: Antoine Boisclair, Le bruissement des possibles
- Dorothy Livesay Poetry Prize: John Pass, Crawlspace
- Prix Émile-Nelligan: Mario Brassard, Le livre clairière

=== France awards and honors ===
- Prix Goncourt de la Poésie:

=== New Zealand awards and honors ===
- New Zealand Post Book Awards
  - Poetry Award winner: Rhian Gallagher, Shift. Auckland University Press
  - NZSA Jessie Mackay Best First Book Award for Poetry: John Adams, Briefcase, Auckland University Press

=== United Kingdom awards and honors ===
- Cholmondeley Award: Christine Evans, Peter Riley, Robin Robertson
- Costa Award (formerly "Whitbread Awards") for poetry: Kathleen Jamie, The Overhaul
  - Shortlist: Sean Borodale, Bee Journal; *Julia Copus, The World's Two Smallest Humans; Selima Hill, People Who Like Meatballs
- English Association's Fellows' Poetry Prizes:
- Eric Gregory Award (for a collection of poems by a poet under the age of 30): Sophie Baker, Joey Connolly, Holly Corfield Carr, Caleb Klaces, Rachael Nicholas, Phoebe Power, Jon Stone
- Forward Poetry Prize:
  - Best Collection: Jorie Graham, PLACE
    - Shortlist:
  - Best First Collection: Sam Riviere, 81 Austerities
    - Shortlist:
  - Best Poem: Denise Riley, "A Part Song"
    - Shortlist:
- Jerwood Aldeburgh First Collection Prize for poetry:
  - Shortlist:
- Manchester Poetry Prize:
- National Poet of Wales:
- National Poetry Competition 2011:
- T. S. Eliot Prize (United Kingdom and Ireland): Sharon Olds, Stag's Leap She is the first American to win this award.
  - Shortlist (announced in November 2012): 2012 Short List
- The Times/Stephen Spender Prize for Poetry Translation:

=== United States awards and honors ===
- Agnes Lynch Starrett Poetry Prize: to Kasey Jueds for Keeper
- AML Award for Poetry awarded to Karen Kelsay for Amytis Leaves Her Garden
- Dwarf Stars Award: Marge Simon, Blue Rose Buddha
- Kate Tufts Discovery Award: Katherine Larson — Radial Symmetry
- Kingsley Tufts Poetry Award: Timothy Donnelly — The Cloud Corporation
- Lambda Literary Award:
  - Gay Poetry: Tim Dlugos (David Trinidad, ed.), A Fast Life: The Collected Poems of Tim Dlugos
  - Lesbian Poetry: Leah Lakshmi Piepzna-Samarasinha, Love Cake
- Lenore Marshall Poetry Prize: David Wojahn for World Tree
- Letras Latinas/Red Hen Poetry Prize awarded to Dan Vera for The Guide to Imaginary Monuments and William Archila for The Gravedigger's Archeology
- National Book Award for Poetry: David Ferry for Bewilderment: New Poems and Translations
- National Book Critics Circle Award for Poetry: D. A. Powell for Useless Landscape, or A Guide for Boys
  - The NBCC shortlist in poetry included – David Ferry for Bewilderment: New Poems and Translations (University of Chicago Press); Lucia Perillo for On the Spectrum of Possible Deaths (Copper Canyon Press); Allan Peterson for Fragile Acts (McSweeney's Books); and A. E. Stallings for Olives (Triquarterly)
- The New Criterion Poetry Prize: George Green for Lord Byron's Foot
- North Carolina Poet Laureate: Joseph Bathanti appointed.
- PEN Award for Poetry in Translation: Jen Hofer for Negro Marfil/Ivory Black by Myriam Moscona
- PEN/Voelcker Award for Poetry: Toi Derricotte
- Pulitzer Prize for Poetry (United States): to Tracy K. Smith for Life on Mars
  - Finalists for Pulitzer: Forrest Gander for Core Samples from the World, and Ron Padgett for How Long. – (selected by the Jury: Philip Schultz, Arthur Sze, and Jean Valentine)
- Raiziss/de Palchi Translation Award: Jennifer Scappettone for Locomotrix: Selected Poetry and Prose by Amelia Rosselli
- Rhysling Award:
  - Megan Arkenberg, The Curator Speaks in the Department of Dead Languages (Long Form)
  - Shira Lipkin, The Library, After (Short Form)
- Ruth Lilly Poetry Prize: W. S. Di Piero
- Wallace Stevens Award: Gary Snyder
- Whiting Awards: Ciaran Berry, Atsuro Riley

==== From the Poetry Society of America ====
- Frost Medal: Marilyn Nelson
- Shelley Memorial Award: – Judges:
- Writer Magazine/Emily Dickinson Award: – Judge:
- Lyric Poetry Award: – Judge:
- Lucille Medwick Memorial Award: – Judge: ; finalist:
- Alice Fay Di Castagnola Award: – Judge: ; finalists:
- Louise Louis/Emily F. Bourne Student Poetry Award: – Judge: ; finalists:
- George Bogin Memorial Award: – Judge:
- Robert H. Winner Memorial Award: – Judge: ; finalists:
- Cecil Hemley Memorial Award: – Judge:
- Norma Farber First Book Award: – Judge:
- William Carlos Williams Award: Bruce Smith for Devotions, Judge: Elizabeth Macklin – ; finalists:

== Deaths ==
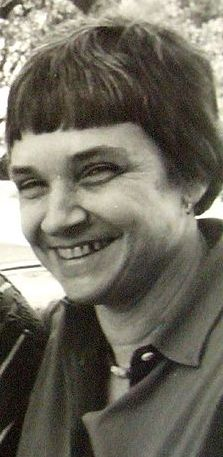
Adrienne Rich, one of the 20th-century's most celebrated poets, died in 2012. Here she is in 1980.

Birth years link to the corresponding "[year] in poetry" article:

- January 6 – Basil Payne, 88 (born 1923), Irish poet.
- January 31 – Stacy Doris, 48 (born 1962), U.S. poet and translator.
- February 1 – Wisława Szymborska, 88 (born 1923), Polish poet who was awarded the Nobel Prize in Literature (1996).
- February 4 – Irene McKinney, 72 (born 1939), American poet who was the Poet Laureate of West Virginia since 1994
- February 6 – Colleen Thibaudeau, 86 (born 1925), a Canadian poet who published her first volume of poetry in 1965. The Canadian Encyclopedia praised her poetry for celebrating “the extraordinary nature of ordinary life by combining the everyday with the otherworldly.”
- February 13:
  - Akhlaq Mohammed Khan, 75 (born 1936), Indian poet, lyricist and academic, lung cancer.
  - Fred Moramarco, 73 (born 1938), U.S. poet and academic and founding editor, Poetry International, SDSU Press.
- February 21 – Barney Rosset, 89 (born 1922), American publisher (Grove Press) and free speech advocate.
- February 23 – Joydeb Basu, 49 (born 1929), Indian poet, heart attack.
- March 2 – James A. "Jim" Hazard, 76 (born ?), U.S. (Indiana-born) poet, journalist, teacher, and musician
- March 4 – Felícia Fuster, 91, Catalan painter and poet
- March 8 – Elio Pagliarani, 84, Italian poet and literary critic
- March 9 – Leonard Cirino (born 1943), U.S. poet and the author of twenty other chapbooks and fourteen full-length collections of poetry since 1987 from numerous small presses
- March 16 – Takaaki Yoshimoto (吉本 隆明, Yoshimoto Takaaki), 87 (born 1924), also known as Ryūmei Yoshimoto, was a Japanese poet, literary critic, and philosopher from Tokyo. He is the father of Japanese writer Banana Yoshimoto and of cartoonist Yoiko Haruno.
- March 21:
  - Tonino Guerra, 92 (born 1920), an Italian concentration camp survivor, poet, writer and screenwriter who collaborated with some of the most prominent film directors of the world
  - Derick Thomson, 90, Scottish poet
- March 26 – Sadaharu Motohashi, 91, Japanese haiku poet (reference is in Japanese)
- March 27 – Adrienne Rich, 82 (born 1929), National Book Award-winning poet
- March 30 – Emrys Roberts, 82, Welsh poet and author
- April 1 – Chūichi Mukawa, 92, Japanese tanka poet (Waseda University) (reference is in Japanese)
- April 6 – Reed Whittemore, 92, American poet
- April 12:
  - Mohit Chattopadhyay, 77, Indian playwright, dramatist, and poet
  - Steinbjørn B. Jacobsen, 74, Faroese poet and writer
- April 17 – Nityananda Mohapatra, 99, Indian politician, poet and journalist
- May 19 – Heiichi Sugiyama, 97 (born 1914), Japanese poet and film critic
- June 27:
  - Rosemary Dobson, 92, Australian poet
  - Peter Steele, 72, Australian poet and academic
- October 29 – J. Bernlef, 75, Dutch poet, novelist and translator
- November 4 – Anne-Marie Albiach, 75, French poet who influenced a generation of American poets that came to prominence in the 1970s and 1980s. Acclaimed for her own poetry and translations of American poetry including Louis Zukofsky.
- November 11 – Jack Gilbert, 87, American poet who received the 2005 National Book Critics Circle Award.
- December 3 – Amir Mahmud Anvar, Iranian literary academic and poet (born 1945)
- December 28 – Jayne Cortez, 78 (born 1934) African-American poet, activist, small press publisher and spoken-word performance artist

== See also ==
- Poetry
- List of poetry awards
