= A Curious Collection of Cats =

Children's poetry book by Betsy Franco and Michael Wertz

- Author: Betsy Franco
- Illustrator: Michael Wertz
- Cover artist: Wertz
- Language: English
- Genre: Children's poetry collection
- Published: 2009 (Tricycle Press)
- Publication place: USA
- Media type: Print (hardback)
- Pages: 40 (unpaginated)
- ISBN: 9781582462486
- OCLC: 881249283

A Curious Collection of Cats: Concrete Poems is a 2009 Children's poetry collection by Betsy Franco and illustrated by Michael Wertz. It is made up of concrete poems in various forms, including haiku, limerick, and free verse, that highlight various aspects of cat behaviour.

== Contents ==
Balancing act
Shadow's dream
Tabitha's tail
A question for Scooter about squirrels
The great escape
A tomcat's yard is his kingdom
Veronica goes wide
Princess
Q-tip and Rosie
Gonzo's snack
Lenny vs. Patch
Cat haiku 1
Cat haiku 2
A tree for Sammantha
Rascal's tongue
Her royal highness
Yoga cat pose
That cat peed on my hat
Fluff is polydactyl
Bingo's birthday party
The purrfect scarf
Hot daze
Symmetricats
Ear decorations
Prickles vs. the golden retriever
Kissy kat
Swettie's groceries
Techno cat
Limerick on a leash
Cat under the blanket
Binky's kittens
Cat door

== Reception ==
A review in Kirkus Reviews of A Curious Collection of Cats wrote "Capturing the spirit of each verse, Wertz turns a collection of otherwise unremarkable visual poems into a true treat for the eyes." and The Horn Book Magazine wrote "Together, poet and artist convey the silliness of cats and their humans without ever being silly themselves".

A Curious Collection of Cats has also been reviewed by Booklist, School Library Journal, and The Bulletin of the Center for Children's Books,

It is a 2012 Beehive Poetry Award nominee.
