= How to Be Drawn =

Poetry collection by Terrance Hayes

- Author: Terrance Hayes
- Cover artist: Alison Forner
- Language: English
- Genre: Poetry
- Publisher: Penguin Group
- Publication date: 2015
- Publication place: United States
- Pages: 112 pp (paperback)
- ISBN: 0-143-12688-1

How to Be Drawn is a poetry collection by Terrance Hayes. The poems take on themes of racial individuality, social prejudices, and personal losses in everyday life. The main focus of the poems are self care for an individual's image or personal hardships. The collection was a finalist for several awards. It was first published in 2015 by the Penguin Group.

== Theme and style ==
The major themes that coincide in this collection are those of racial and social injustices. Other themes throughout this work are violence, family troubles, and everyday personal loss. Hayes surveys, throughout this collection, how people see and how people are seen by others. The collection draws inspiration from other works of art, from novels to music to games. In "How to Be Drawn to Trouble", the poem features lyrics from James Brown to explore the pressures of matrimonial and familial hungers. In the poem "How to Draw an Invisible Man", Hayes analyzes what it means to be invisible but also visible in America. Trevor Ketner, writing in The Rumpus, said that it "echoes the cultural critique of race relations in America" he found in Ralph Ellison's work Invisible Man.

The poems are written in free verse, meaning there is no set rhyme scheme, stanza form, or metrical structure. The diction used throughout the collection is conversational and Hayes uses word play to convey the message that he has for each of his poems, instead of drawing away using rhythm or rhyme. Poet Tess Taylor noted that "his writing is full of puns and fake outs, leads and dodges, all encased in muscular music."

== Poems ==
=== I. Troubled Bodies ===
- What It Look Like
- The Deer
- How to Be Drawn to Trouble
- New York Poem
- As Traffic
- Wigphrastic
- My Life as a Hammer
- Gentle Measures
- A Concept of Survival
- Who Are the Tribes

=== II. Invisible Souls ===
- Black Confederate Ghost Story
- How to Draw an Invisible Man
- Barberism
- The Carpenter Ant
- American Sonnet for Wanda C.
- Like Mercy
- A Machine
- Portrait of Etheridge Knight in the Style of a Crime Report: Part I
- Portrait of Etheridge Knight in the Style of a Crime Report: Part II
- Portrait of Etheridge Knight in the Style of a Crime Report: Part III
- Elegy with Zombies for Life
- Instructions for a Séance with the Vladimirs

=== III. A Circling Mind ===
- The Rose Has Teeth
- Antebellum House Party
- Reconstructed Reconstruction
- We Should Make a Documentary About Spades
- For Crying Out Loud
- Model Prison Model
- Some Maps to Indicate Pittsburgh
- New Jersey Poem
- Self-Portrait as the Mind of a Camera
- How to Draw a Perfect Circle
- Ars Poetica for the Ones Like Us

== Awards ==
How to Be Drawn was a finalist for the 2015 National Book Award for Poetry and the National Book Critics Circle Award. It was the winner of the 2016 NAACP Image Award for Outstanding Literary Work - Poetry.
