= Laura Ulewicz =

American poet

Laura Ulewicz (May 18, 1930 – October 5, 2007) was an American poet.

== Biography ==
Born in Detroit, Michigan to Polish-American auto workers with strong union ties, she lived in Chicago and New York before moving to San Francisco in 1950. There, she soon discovered the literary scene in North Beach, where she became friends with many of the area's Beat poets, including Allen Ginsberg, Kenneth Rexroth, and Ruth Weiss. She was also in a significant long-term relationship with poet Jack Gilbert during the latter part of that time period. Ulewicz was a great influence on his early work; in fact much of his characteristic style for which he was later well-known came directly from her, and his acclaimed first book Views of Jeopardy was dedicated to her.

Ulewicz refused to ever be branded a Beat herself. In 1955, at the height of media attention on North Beach and the Beats, she left for Seattle to study with Stanley Kunitz where her work took on a more formally structured approach. In 1960 she traveled in Europe, eventually moving to London where she met with THE GROUP at Edward Lucie-Smith's and joined with other members to give public readings of their work. She won the Guinness Poetry Award at the Cheltenham Literature Festival in 1964. Her chapbook The Inheritance was published by Turret Press in 1967.

In 1965, Ulewicz returned to live in San Francisco's Haight-Ashbury district, the new Hippy neighborhood, where she opened and managed the I-Thou Coffee House. There, she organized poetry readings, art exhibits and folk concerts. Shortly after her return, a Penguin editor wrote to propose a volume in which her work would be joined with Denise Levertov and Sylvia Plath. Six months later he wrote back to say that he could not get his fellow editors and marketing to support a book of three women poets. During the late 60s, she hosted a radio program on KQED-FM in which writers read and were interviewed. In 1968, while she continued to publish in magazines, she was the recipient of an NEA grant to "assist gifted but unrecognized writers".

Ulewicz withdrew to the delta town of Locke, California in 1973. Initially, she worked at a local tomato cannery, but was later employed with Child Protection Services in the county's Social Welfare Department. After retirement, she managed an art gallery in Locke. Always an inveterate gardener, she raised various kinds of garlic and everlasting flowers to sell at farmers’ markets. During the last thirty years of her life, she continued to write but published little after 1975.

She died on October 5, 2007, aged 77, after a short illness. The local community commemorated her in its memorial site. Stephen Vincent, poet, editor, and artist, is the executor of her literary estate.
