= Good Blonde & Others =

1993 collection of works by Jack Kerouac

- Good Blonde & Others book cover
- Author: Jack Kerouac
- Language: English
- Genre: Short stories Literary criticism Essays
- Publisher: Grey Fox Press
- Publication date: 1993
- Publication place: United States
- Media type: Print (hardback & paperback)
- Pages: 232 pp
- ISBN: 0-912516-22-4
- OCLC: 28064613
- Dewey Decimal: 814/.54 20
- LC Class: PS3521.E735 G6 1993
- Preceded by: Atop an Underwood (1991)
- Followed by: Orpheus Emerged (2002)

Good Blonde & Others is a collection of works by Jack Kerouac. This collection includes short stories, essays, articles, literary criticism, and his essentials for spontaneous prose. It is largely seen as a look into the non-fiction life of Beat Generation author Jack Kerouac.

== Table of contents ==
- On the Road
- On the Beats
- On Writing
- Observations
- On Sports
- Last Words
- cityCityCITY
- Editor's Note
