= Atop an Underwood =

Anthology of America best writer Jack Kerouac's

Atop an Underwood: Early Stories and Other Writings
- First edition
- Author: Jack Kerouac
- Language: English
- Genre: Short story collection Beat
- Publisher: Viking Press
- Publication date: 1999
- Publication place: United States
- Media type: Print (hardback & paperback)
- Pages: 272 pages
- ISBN: 0-14-029639-5
- OCLC: 45436248
- Preceded by: Old Angel Midnight (1973)
- Followed by: Good Blonde & Others (1993)

Atop an Underwood: Early Stories and Other Writings is an anthology of American Beat writer Jack Kerouac's early work, published by Viking Press in 1999. It includes writings from Kerouac's high school years, poetry, short stories, essays and other previously unpublished works. The book includes an introduction by its editor Paul Marion along with notes on the stories included throughout the book.
