= Renée Ashley =

American poet

- Born: Palo Alto, California, U.S.
- Education: San Francisco State University
- Occupations: Poet; novelist; essayist; educator

Renée Ashley (born August 10, 1949) is an American poet, novelist, essayist, and educator.

Presently on the faculty of Fairleigh Dickinson University and an editor of The Literary Review, Ashley is the author of five collections of poetry, two chapbooks and a novel. Her work has garnered several honours including the Brittingham Prize in Poetry, Pushcart Prize, as well as fellowships granted by the New Jersey State Council on the Arts and the National Endowment of the Arts. Several of her poems have been published in noted literary journals and magazines, including Poetry, American Voice, Bellevue Literary Review, Harvard Review, Kenyon Review, and The Literary Review.

== Life and career ==
Ashley was born in Palo Alto, California and raised nearby in Redwood City. Her father worked infrequently in a ball bearing factory and her mother was a PBX telephone operator and secretary; she was their only child. In interviews, she describes her parents as being an "anti influence" on her literary pursuits—mentioning that she was raised in a house that had no books and that her mother believed that "if you’re reading you’re not doing anything."

Ashley attended San Francisco State University and was graduated with a Bachelor of Arts (B.A.) degree in three majors (in French, English, and Comparative Literature) in 1979. Subsequently, she earned a Master of Arts (M.A.) in Comparative Literature from San Francisco State University in 1981. Ashley came to poetry later in life and by chance. While attending a fiction writing seminar at a writer's conference at Foothill College in Los Altos Hills, California, she was inspired to start writing poetry after "wandering away" and encountering a poetry reading by John Logan (1923–1987).

Ashley presently resides in Ringwood, New Jersey and is on the faculty of Fairleigh Dickinson University teaching in the university's graduate degree programmes for a Master of Fine Arts (MFA) in Creative Writing (2001–present) and Master of Arts in Creative Writing and Literature for Educators (2010–present). Since 1994, she has been on the faculty of the Winter Poetry & Prose Getaway, a large writers conference recently hosted by Stockton University (formerly Richard Stockton College) and Murphy Writing Seminars.

She previously taught creative writing at Ramapo College (1989–1993) in Mahwah, New Jersey and at Rockland Center for the Arts (1985–1995) in West Nyack, New York. For five years (1997–2002), she was assistant poetry coordinator for the Geraldine R. Dodge Foundation, a not-for-profit philanthropic organisation that gives grants to environmental and social projects, educators and artists and operates a biennial four-day poetry festival in New Jersey that is the largest poetry event in North America. For several years, from 2007 until 2014, she was poetry editor of Fairleigh Dickinson University's literary quarterly The Literary Review.

== Critical reception ==
The Los Angeles Review wrote of The View from the Body (2016): "Context is everything for meaning; there is no definition free of it. We are all in a context inextricably bound up in the definition of who we are. For better or worse, that imposes limits, especially the physical ones, with death being the ultimate defining context. However, the struggle against limits remains heroic and is better than the alternatives of apathy, acquiescence, even the embrace of oppression. The struggle against limits is what creates us and makes our beloved underdogs. We are how we respond to mortality. Renee Ashley’s collection is an intellectually brilliant banner in that battle."

The Literary Review wrote of The View from the Body (2016): "The phantoms of Sexton, Plath, Rich, and others all inform The View from the Body, but Ashley is operating in undiscovered country, pushing and probing what the line and sentence can do when called into question. Renée Ashley’s finely tuned sensibilities allow her to experiment with language and form without sacrificing meaning and beauty."

Publishers Weekly reviewed Ashley's seventh book of poetry, Because I Am the Shore I Want to Be the Sea (2013), a series of prose poems on the subjects of "sex, courtship, fear, fatigue, loyalty, companion animals, and human regret" as "squared-off, almost blindingly vivid" and "committed to individual feeling, lyric, texture, emotional rawness, and authenticity."

== Poetry in Penn Station ==
A six-line excerpt from Ashley's poem "First Book of the Moon" in The Revisionist's Dream (2001) was selected for a permanent installation by artist Larry Kirkland in New York City's Pennsylvania Station.

"...We dream our lives
But the rivers breathe flint and spark
And each night we believe in everything—
The shifting edge of light
And dark, the possibility of what we think we are
And what we think we see."

Carved in marble, this installation features excerpts from the works of several New Jersey poets (including Walt Whitman, William Carlos Williams, and Amiri Baraka) and was part of the renovation and reconstruction of the New Jersey Transit section of the station completed in 2002.

== Works ==
=== Poetry ===
Ashley has released six collections of poetry and two chapbooks.

- 1992: Salt (University of Wisconsin Press) ISBN 978-0299131449
- 1998: The Various Reason of Light (Avocet Press) ISBN 978-0966107210
- 2001: The Revisionist's Dream (Avocet Press) ISBN 978-0970504920
- 2006: The Museum of Lost Wings (chapbook) (Hill-Stead Museum Press)
- 2009: Basic Heart (Texas Review Press) ISBN 978-0966107210
- 2010: The Verbs of Desiring (chapbook) (New American Press) ISBN 978-0981780252
- 2013: Because I Am the Shore I Want to Be the Sea (Subito Press) ISBN 978-0983115083
- 2016: The View from the Body (Black Lawrence Press)

=== Fiction ===
- 2003: Someplace Like This (Permanent Press) ISBN 978-1-57962-090-5

=== Essays ===
- 2019: Minglements: Prose on Poetry and Life (Del Sol Press) ISBN 978-0-9998425-3-9

== Honors and awards ==
In recognition of her achievements in poetry and writing, Renée Ashley has earned the following awards and fellowships:

=== Awards and competitions ===
- 2012: Subito Press Book Award, Winner
- 2009: New American Press Chapbook Competition, Winner
- 2008: X. J. Kennedy Award in Poetry, Texas Review Press, Winner
- 2007: Runner-up, American Literary Review Poetry Contest
- 2006: Black Warrior Review Poetry Contest, First place
- 2006: Hill-Stead Museum Sunken Garden Poetry competition, Winner
- 1999: Pushcart Prize (Volume XXIV)
- 1998: Charles Angoff Award, The Literary Review
- 1997: American Literary Review Poetry Contest
- 1996: Chelsea Award for Poetry
- 1992: Fourth Annual Kenyon Review Award for Literary Excellence
- 1992‑1993: Special Mention, Pushcart Prize XVII
- 1991: Brittingham Prize in Poetry, University of Wisconsin Press
- 1990: Judith's Room Emerging Talent Competition
- 1990: Kenyon Review Award for Literary Excellence for Emerging Writers
- 1989: Robert H. Winner Award (Co‑winner), Poetry Society of America
- 1989: Open Voice Award: Poetry, Writers Voice, West Side Y, NY, NY
- 1988: Eve of St. Agnes Award, Negative Capability, Mobile, AL
- 1988: Ruth Lake Memorial Award, Runner‑up, Poetry Society of America, NY
- 1987: Ruth Lake Memorial Award, Poetry Society of America, New York, NY
- 1986: Washington Prize in Poetry, Word Works Inc., Washington, DC
- 1985: Cecil Hackney Literary Award, Birmingham‑Southern College
- 1980: Milton Award, San Mateo County Arts Council, CA
- 1978: Wings Award

=== Fellowships ===
- 2017: Associate Artist, Atlantic Center for the Arts
- 2013: Fellow, Virginia Center for the Creative Arts
- 2012: Fellow, Virginia Center for the Creative Arts
- 2008: Associate Artist, Atlantic Center for the Arts
- 2006: Full Fellowship, Vermont Studio Center
- 2005: Distinguished Poet in Residence, Wichita State University, Kansas
- 2003–2004: Fellowship in Poetry, New Jersey State Council on the Arts
- 1997: National Endowment for the Arts Fellowship in Poetry
- 1994–1995: Fellowship in Poetry, New Jersey State Council on the Arts
- 1994: Fellow, MacDowell Colony, Peterborough, NH
- 1993: Fellow, MacDowell Colony, Peterborough, NH
- 1993: Grant, Poets & Writers, teaching
- 1990: Fellow, Yaddo, Saratoga Springs, NY;
- 1990: Fellowship: Geraldine R. Dodge Foundation
- 1989: Fellowship in Poetry, New Jersey State Council on the Arts
- 1989: Fellowship, Woodrow Wilson National Fellowship Foundation/Department of Higher Education
- 1989: Grant: College Foundation, Ramapo College of New Jersey, Summer Institute Series for New Jersey Faculty
- 1986‑87: Writer‑in‑Residence, Rockland Center for the Arts, West Nyack, NY
- 1986: Grant, New York State Council on the Arts, Residency
- 1986: Grant, Poets & Writers, Inc., New York, NY, Teaching
- 1985: Fellowship in Prose, New Jersey State Council on the Arts
