= Monolithos =

1982 poetry collection by Jack Gilbert

- Author: Jack Gilbert
- Publication date: 1983

Monolithos, Poems 1962 and 1982 is the second book of poetry by American poet Jack Gilbert. It was nominated for all three major American book awards: the National Book Critics Circle Award, the Pulitzer Prize for Poetry, and the National Book Award. The same year Monolithos was published, Gilbert's partner Michiko Nogami died of cancer.

== Overview ==
Released by Alfred A. Knopf in a 1982 hardcover edition, Monolithos came twenty years after Views of Jeopardy, which won Gilbert the Yale Series of Younger Poets Competition in 1962.

A subsequent paperback edition of Monolithos was released by Graywolf Press in 1984. However, the limited availability of this edition has caused the book's value to climb from its original six-dollar publication price to amounts between $100 and $250, depending on the seller.

The book is divided into two sections: One - 1962 contains revised and collected poems from Views of Jeopardy, while Two [Monolithos] 1982 consists of new poems, written mainly on the Greek islands of Paros and Santorini. Gilbert stayed there with the poet Linda Gregg during their marriage.

Of the title, Gilbert writes in the foreword, "Monolithos means single stone, and refers to the small hill behind our house which gave the place we lived its name. It is the tip of a non-igneous stone island buried in debris when most of Thira blew apart 3,500 years ago."

== Poems in Monolithos ==
=== One * 1962 ===
- The Abnormal Is Not Courage
- Between Poems
- Perspective He Would Mutter Going to Bed
- And She Waiting
- Don Giovanni On His Way to Hell
- The Plundering of Circe
- Island and Figs
- On Growing Old In San Francisco
- County Musician
- I'll Try to Explain About the Fear
- Rain
- Poetry Is a Kind of Lying
- It May Be No One Should Be Opened
- New York, Summer
- In Dispraise of Poetry
- Susanna and the Elders
- For Example
- The Night Comes Every Day to My Window
- The Sirens Again
- Before Morning in Perugia
- Orpheus in Greenwich Village
- Alba
- Ostinato Rigore
- A Bird Sings to Establish Frontiers
- Bartleby at the Wall
- The Whiteness, the Sound, and Alcibiades

=== Two * [Monolithos] * 1982 ===
- All the Way From There to Here
- Not Part of Literature
- Trying to Be Married
- Registration
- More Than Friends
- That Tenor of Which the Night Birds Are a Vehicle
- Walking Home Across the Island
- Mistrust of Bronze
- Angelus
- A Kind of World
- Leaving Monolithos
- Divorce
- Remembering My Wife
- Pewter
- Night After Night
- Hunger
- Sects
- They Call It Attempted Suicide
- Miniscus
- Who's There
- Meaning Well
- Template
- Siege
- Translation Into the Original
- Burning and Fathering: Accounts of My Country
- The Fashionable Heart
- Breakfast
- Losing
- The Rainy Forests of Northern California
- Il Mio Tesoro
- Don Giovanni in Trouble
- The Movies
- Byzantium Burning
- They Will Put My Body Into the Ground
- Love Poem
- Elephant Hunt in Guadalajara
- Pavane
- Loyalty
- Song
- Getting Ready
- Sur Ponticello
- The Cucumbers of Praxilla of Sicyon
- A Description of Happiness in København
- New Hampshire Marble
- My Marriage With Mrs. Johnson
- Heart Skidding
- Games
- My Graveyard in Tokyo
- Alone on Christmas Eve in Japan
- Textures
- The Revolution
- Mexico
- Another Grandfather
- Singing in My Difficult Mountains
- Threshing the Fire
