= Aaron McCollough =

American poet

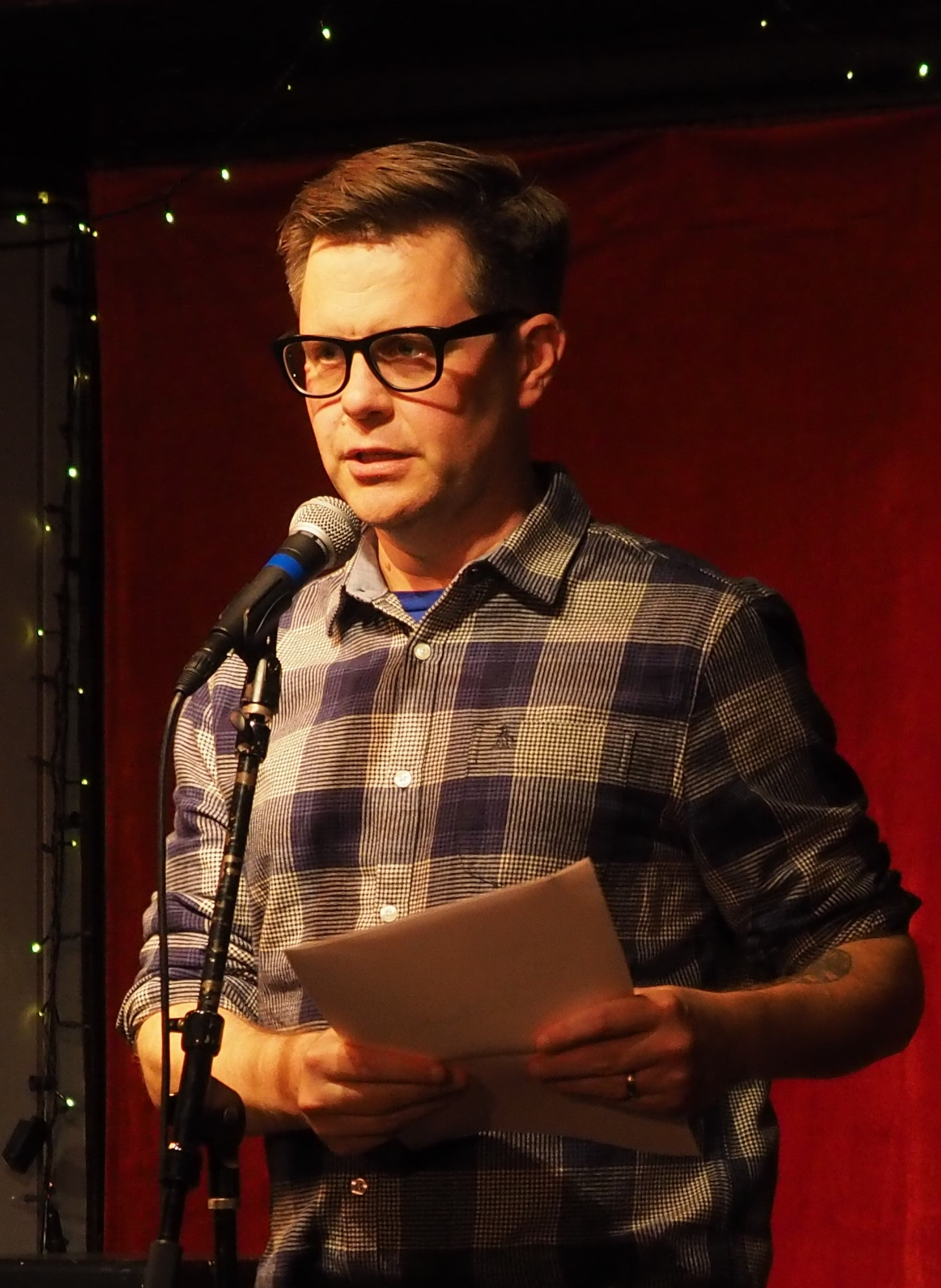
- Aaron McCollough
- Born: 1971 (age 54–55); Columbus, Ohio
- Education: University of the South, North Carolina State University, Iowa Writers' Workshop; University of Michigan
- Writing career
- Genre: Poetry

Aaron McCollough is an American poet.

== Life and career ==
Aaron McCollough was born in 1971 in Columbus, Ohio and raised in Tennessee. He has a BA from the University of the South (1994), an MA in English Literature from North Carolina State University (1998), an MFA in creative writing from the Iowa Writers' Workshop (2001), as well as an MA and PhD in English Language and Literature from the University of Michigan (2002 & 2007 respectively). Having worked at the University of Michigan Library and University of Michigan Press for a number of years, he began as Scholarly Communications & Publishing Librarian at the University of Illinois in August 2015.

In 2001, McCollough started the online poetry magazine GutGult. The magazine published eight issues between 2001 and 2010. Along with Karla Kelsey, he now edits a small press called SplitLevel Texts.

== Book Publications ==
- Salms University of Iowa Press, 2024. ISBN 978-1609389833, OCLC 1451804947
- Rank University of Iowa Press, 2015. ISBN 9781609383893, OCLC 905089419
- Underlight Ugly Duckling Presse, 2012. ISBN 9781937027087, OCLC 824193851
- No Grave Can Hold My Body Down Ahsahta Press, 2011. ISBN 9781934103227, OCLC 720024538
- Little Ease Ahsahta Press, 2006. ISBN 9780916272906, OCLC 64208293
- Double Venus Salt Publishing, 2003. ISBN 9781844710034, OCLC 54713053
- Welkin, published by Ahsahta Press in 2002. ISBN 9780916272722, OCLC 49375535

== Publication in Anthologies ==
- Hick Poetics: Anthology of Contemporary Rural American Poetry
- The Arcadia Project: North American Postmodern Pastoral
- Isn't It Romantic: 100 Love Poems by Younger American Poets
- Joyful Noise: An Anthology of American Spiritual Poetry
- Gamers: Writers, Artists, and Programmers on the Pleasure of Pixels

== Publications in Periodicals ==
McCollough has published poems in 1913, 6 x 6, Boston Review, jubilat, A Public Space, Denver Quarterly, Colorado Review, Fence, Quarterly West, The Canary, VOLT, American Letters & Commentary, Conduit, LIT, Slope, Carolina Quarterly, Jacket, Court Green, and numerous other journals.

== Reviews ==
McCollough's books have been reviewed in print journals including Denver Quarterly, Colorado Review, and Publishers Weekly as well as in online journals such as Free Verse, Coldfront, NewPages and Eclectica.

== Awards ==
- Gertrude Stein Award in Innovative Poetry, 2005.
- Sawtooth Poetry Prize, Ahsahta Press, for Welkin, 2001.
- Bain-Swiggett Poetry Prize, 1993.

== Teaching ==
McCollough has taught at North Carolina State University, The University of Iowa, and The University of Michigan. He was a visiting poet at Hendrix College.
