= Kari o Komal =

Bengali poetry book written by Rabindranath Tagore

Kari O Komal (Bengali: কড়ি ও কোমল; English: Sharps and Flats) is a Bengali poetry book written by Rabindranath Tagore in 1886. It consists of 83 poems.

== Dedication ==
Tagore dedicated this book to his elder brother, Satyendranath Tagore.

== List of poems ==
The poems of Kari o Komal are:

1. Puratan
2. Jogia
3. Mathuray
4. Shanti
5. Patra
6. Khela
7. Biraha
8. Sarabela
9. Gaan
10. Khanik milan
11. Chumban
12. Charan
13. Deher milon
14. Hriday-akash
15. Nidritar chitra
16. Shranti
17. Moh
18. Marichika
19. Ratri
20. Sindhugarbha
21. Astaman rabi
22. Swapnarudhha
23. Kobir ahankar
24. Satya
25. Khudra ami
26. Chiradin
27. Ahabangeet
28. Kobir mantabya
29. Nutan
30. Kangalini
31. Baner chaya
32. Pasani maa
33. Birahir patra
34. Basanta-abasan
35. Baki
36. Akankhha
37. Choto phul
38. Gitochwas
39. Bibasana
40. Hriday-akash
41. Tanu
42. Kalpanar sathi
43. Kalpanamadhup
44. Bondi
45. Pabitra prem
46. Gaan-rachana
47. Boitarani
48. Khudra ananta
49. Astachaler parapare
50. Akhamata
51. Bijone
52. Atmabhiman
53. Prarthana
54. Bangabhumir prati
55. Shesh katha
56. Pran
57. Upakatha
58. Bhabisyater rangabhumi
59. Kothay
60. Hridayer bhasa
61. Mangalgeet
62. Banshi
63. Bilap
64. Tumi
65. Joubanswapna
66. Stan
67. Bahu
68. Anchaler batas
69. Smriti
70. Hasi
71. Purna milan
72. Keno
73. Pabitra jibon
74. Sandhyar biday
75. Manabhridayer basana
76. samudra
77. Pratyasha
78. Jagibar chesta
79. Sindhutire
80. Atma-apaman
81. Basanar phand
82. Bangabasir prati
83. Sanjojan
