= Kabi-Kahini =

1878 poetry book by Rabindranath Tagore

Kabi-Kahini (Bengali: কবি-কাহিনী; English: The Tale of the Poet) is a Bengali poetry book written by Rabindranath Tagore in 1878 at the age of 16. It was his first published literary work or book of poems. The poems were published in the "Bharati" literary magazine regularly. His friend Prabodhchandra Ghosh was the publisher of the book.
