= Bhagna Hriday =

Bengali long lyrical poem

Bhagna Hriday (Bengali: ভগ্নহৃদয়; English: The Broken Heart) is a Bengali long lyrical poem written by Rabindranath Tagore in 1881. He started writing it while on a trip to London. After reading Bhagna Hriday, Maharaja Bir Chandra Manikya awarded Rabindranath Tagore the title of best poet.
