= Old Angel Midnight =

Book by Jack Kerouac

- First edition
- Author: Jack Kerouac
- Language: English
- Genre: Poetry; Beat Generation
- Publisher: Booklegger
- Publication date: 1973
- Publication place: United States
- Media type: Print (hardback and paperback)
- Pages: 89 pages
- ISBN: 0-912516-97-6
- OCLC: 27683446
- Dewey Decimal: 811/.54 20
- LC Class: PS3521.E735 O43 1993
- Preceded by: Scattered Poems (1971)
- Followed by: Atop an Underwood (1991)

Old Angel Midnight is a long narrative poem by American novelist and poet Jack Kerouac. It was culled from five notebooks spanning from 1956 to 1959, while Kerouac was fully absorbed by his studies of Buddhism and Buddhist philosophy. Kerouac initially experimented with Old Angel Midnight (then called "Lucien Midnight") in 1953 in his diary titled "1953. Notes again." In entries dated from November 20 to December 3, 1953, he made notes on "Lucien Midnight" which was to be originally conceptualized in what he called "book movie" form, when he closed his eyes and projected onto paper a cinematic sense of what he heard. A bookmovie, he explained in Some of the Dharma, is a "prose concentration camera-eye visions of a definite movie of the mind with fade-ins, pans, close-ups, and fade-outs." Kerouac's notes on Lucien Midnight were written while staying on the Lower East Side where he initially heard sounds coming through a tenement window from the wash court below. He then heard voices coming from kitchens of the other occupants in nearby apartment buildings and a man named Paddy arriving home drunk, and even a junky stirring in his bed. Kerouac conceptualized an idea of developing a work based on James Joyce’s experimental novel Finnegans Wake (not Ulysses as indicated by Ann Charters in her introduction to Old Angel Midnight for Grey Fox Press) where the “sounds of the universe” became the chief “plot” with all of its associated “neologisms, mental associations, puns and wordmixes” that stewed a plethora of languages and “nonlanguages.” Kerouac determinedly “scribbled out in a strictly intuitional discipline at breakneck speed” the fledgling prose that would finally comprise the finished book for City Lights's Pocket Poet series eight years later. Kerouac's one dogma was to compose Lucien Midnight strictly in pencil by candlelight. Lucien Midnight differs from his sketching method of writing because it is based upon an aural experience, and not visual. The bookmovie approach was abandoned in 1953 in favor of a different approach he had stylistically achieved by 1956.

In other notes from the time, Kerouac described Lucien Midnight as a "monolog of the world."

On March 1, 1957, while staying with William S. Burroughs in Tangiers, Kerouac worked on Lucien Midnight. Kerouac said of the poem:

"Old Angel Midnight" is only the beginning of a lifelong work in multilingual sound, representing the haddalada-babra of babbling world tongues coming in thru my window at midnight no matter where I live or what I'm doing, in Mexico, Morocco, New York, India or Pakistan, in Spanish, French, Aztec, Gaelic, Keltic, Kurd or Dravidian, the sounds of people yakking and of myself yakking among, ending finally in great intuitions of the sounds of tongues throughout the entire universe in all directions in and out forever. And it is the only book I've ever written in which I allow myself the right to say anything I want, absolutely and positively anything, since that's what you hear coming in that window... God in his Infinity wouldn't have had a world otherwise — Amen."

Kerouac began the first notebook on April 1, 1956. By now his spontaneous prose method had become second nature to him. Kerouac was staying with Gary Snyder in his Mill Valley cabin. Writing John Clellon Holmes on May 21, 1956, Kerouac explained his intentions: “I don’t know what to write anymore, I’ve been doodling with an endless automatic writing piece which raves on and on with no direction and no story and surely that wont do tho I’ll finish it anyway while doing other things. Old Angel Midnight was first printed in Big Table 1, 1959. Big Table was a new magazine started by Paul Carrol and Irving Rosenthal published after the University of Chicago censored the student magazine, The Chicago Review. A "prose picnic" is what Judge Julius Hoffman called Kerouac's poem, in the ensuing trial of the Post Office vs. Big Table.

To Kerouac, Old Angel Midnight was the only “form in which I am allowed to say anything I want because not only I’ve got to approximate the speed and content of mindflow naked word-babble,” but that it could give him to “swim” with absolute freedom, “dedicatedly crazed in the sea of that language.” Within the scope of that work, Kerouac envisioned the voices he heard discussing the “long weekend from Friday afternoon as it moves into Sunday night.” When he prepared drafts for eventual publication, Lucien Carr objected to the use of his first name, telling Kerouac that it was “pejorative.” It should have been, Kerouac explained to Ginsberg in a letter on August 28, 1958, “majorative,” referring to Lucien Midnight's intended all-encompassing universal sweep of humanity and its surrounding cosmos.

In December 1958, Kerouac stayed up through the night skimming through the pages of the Holy Bible and an English dictionary looking for a replacement title. When he heard Charles Van Doren, on a morning talk show (the son of Mark Van Doren and notoriously involved in a television quiz show scandal that decade) refer to a phrase from Mark Twain’s journal, Kerouac had his answer. Twain writes, "I never felt so happy in my life, sir — never since I was born, sir. Loved that hoary, venerable old angel as if he was my father, sir.” Lucien Midnight then became Old Angel Midnight.

Kerouac dedicated the poem to Lucien Carr, a friend of Kerouac who was a key member of the early Beat Generation, and whose manner of speech was the initial inspiration for Old Angel Midnight.
