= Književna reč =

- First issue: 1972
- Final issue: 2004
- Country: Serbia

Književna reč was a literary magazine that was published first in Yugoslavia, and then in Serbia from 1972 to 2004. It had a significant influence on Yugoslav literary and cultural scene, especially during 1980s. The magazine was publishing leading authors of the period, and also bringing literary news from the country and abroad.
