= Prabhat Sangeet =

- Prabhat Sangeet 1st edition (1883) title page
- Author: Rabindranath Tagore
- Original title: প্রভাত সঙ্গীত
- Language: Bengali
- Genre: Poetry
- Published: 1883
- Publication place: British India

Prabhat Sangeet is a collection of Bengali poetry by poet Rabindranath Tagore. The book was first published in 1883 and was followed by Tagore's earlier work Sandhya Sangeet (1882). This works also marks the end of the second stage of Tagore's poetic career.

== Theme ==
In this book the poet celebrated the nature and joyousness of the world. He also revisited his childhood. Tagore explained: "At last one day, I do not know how, the bolted door was broken open and I got back what I had lost. I did not merely get it back but through the barrier of separation, got a fuller idea of it. That is why I got much more when in the Prabhat Sangeet, I got back the world of my childhood. Thus easy access to nature followed by separation and reunion marked the end of an episode in the first chapter of my life."
