= Sandhya Sangeet =

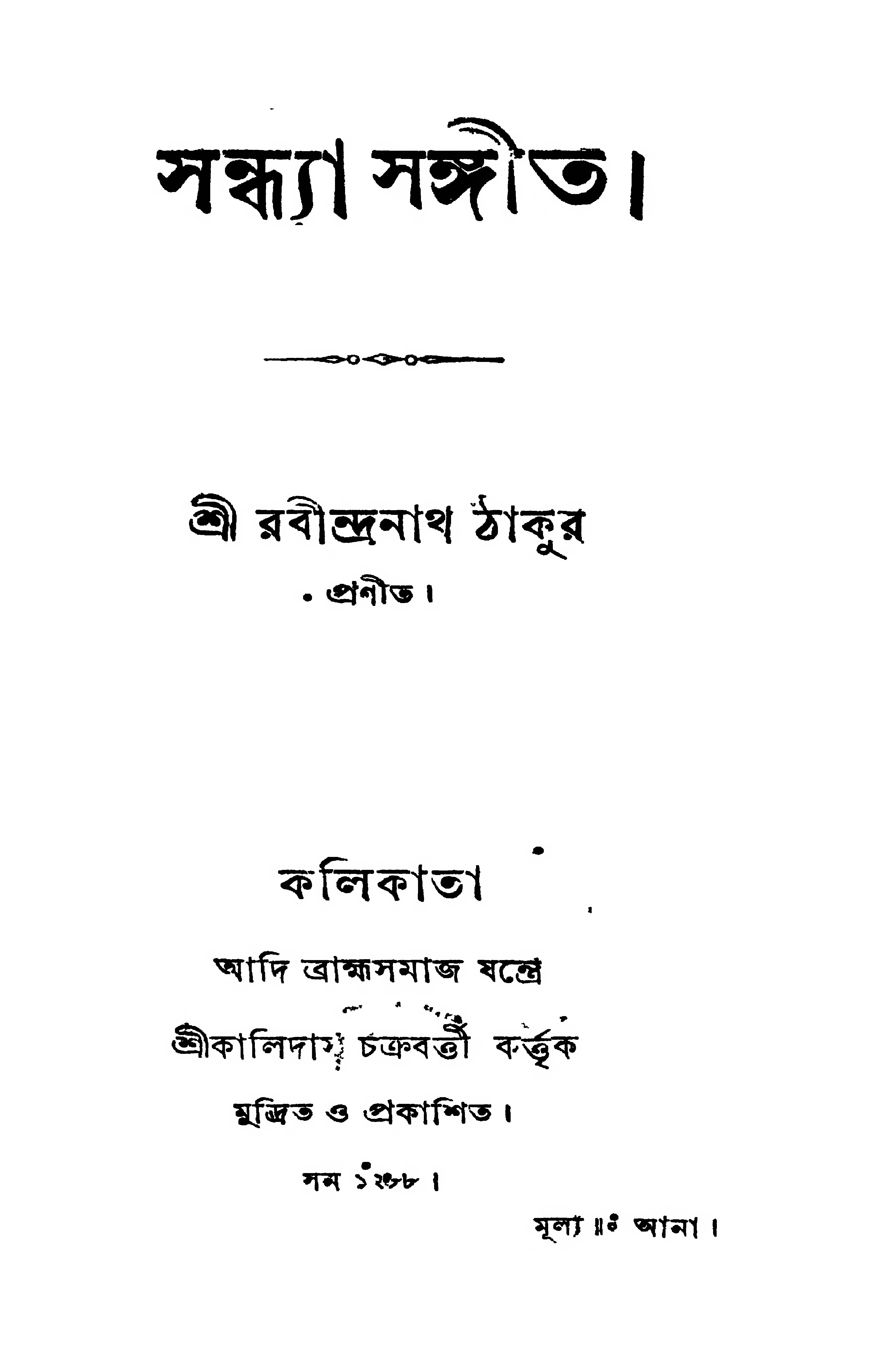
- Title page of the 1st edition
- Author: Rabindranath Tagore
- Original title: সন্ধ্যা সঙ্গীত
- Language: Bengali
- Genre: Poetry
- Publication date: 1882
- Publication place: British India

Sandhya Sangeet (Bengali: সন্ধ্যা সঙ্গীত) is a poetry book written by Rabindranath Tagore in 1882. In English it was translated as Evening Songs. The book was followed by Tagore's another poetry collection Prabhat Sangeet (1883).

== See also ==
- List of works by Rabindranath Tagore
