= Manasi (poetry collection) =

Book of poetry by Rabindranath Tagore

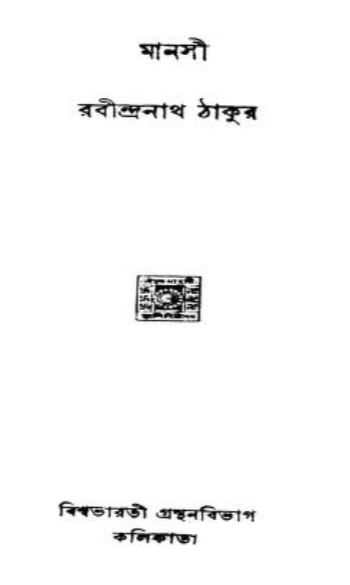
- Title page for Manasi (1890)
- Author: Rabindranath Tagore
- Original title: মানসী
- Language: Bengali
- Genre: Poetry
- Published: 1890
- Publication place: India

Manasi (Bengali: মানসী; English: "Mental Images" or "The Mind's Creation") is an 1890 Bengali poetry book written by Rabindranath Tagore. It comes under the "Manasi-Sonar Tari Group" of Tagore's poetry writings.

== Background ==
Tagore was also a traveller. He was in Ghazipur when he wrote most of the poems of Manasi. The natural environment helped Tagore to write the complete rhythmical work. It was his first matured work where he did different types of rhythmical experiments.

== List of poems ==
The list is in alphabetical order:

1. Ananta prem
2. Apekha
3. Ahalyar prati
4. Akankhha
5. Agantuk
6. Atmasamarpan
7. Amar sukh
8. Ashankha
9. Ushrinkhal
10. Ekal o sekal
11. Ogo bhalo kare bole jao
12. kobir prati nibedan
13. Kuhudhani
14. Khanik milan
15. Gupta prem
16. Godhuli
17. Jibonmadhanye
18. Tabu
19. Duranta asha
20. Desher unnati
21. Dharmaprachar
22. Dhyan
23. Nababangadampattir premalap
24. Narir ukti
25. Ninduker prati nibedan
26. Nivrita ashram
27. Nisthur sristi
28. Nisphal kamana
29. Nisphal prayas
30. Patra
31. Patrer pratyasha
32. Paritykta
33. Purusher ukti
34. Purbakale
35. Prakashbedana
36. Prakritir prati
37. Bangabir
38. Badhu
39. Barshar dine
40. Bichhed
41. Bichheder shanti
42. Biday
43. Birahananda
44. Byekta prem
45. Bhul-bhanga
46. Bhule
47. Bhairavi gaan
48. Maranswapna
49. Manasik abhisar
50. Maya
51. Meghdoot
52. Megher khela
53. Mouna bhasa
54. Shunyo grihe
55. Shunyo hridayer akankhha
56. Shesh upahar
57. Shranti
58. Shrabaner patra
59. Sanshayer abeg
60. Sandhyay
61. Sindhutaranga
62. Surdaser prarthana
63. Hridayer dhan
