= Felícia Fuster =

Spanish painter and poet (1921–2012)

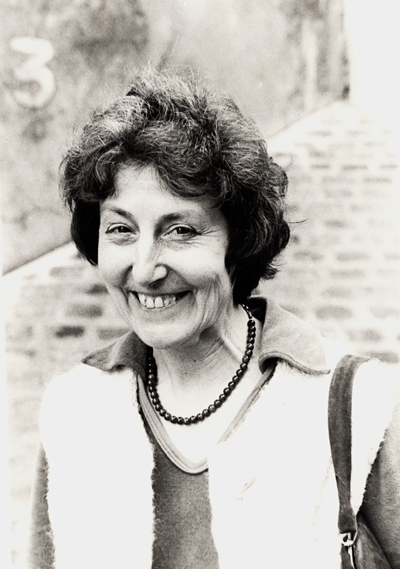
- Born: 7 January 1921 Barcelona, Spain
- Died: 3 March 2012 (aged 91) Paris, France
- Occupation: Poet, translator, painter
- Language: Catalan
- Genre: Poetry

Felícia Fuster i Viladecans (7 January 1921 – 3 March 2012) was a Spanish painter, poet and translator. Born in Barcelona, she moved to Paris in 1951. She was finalist for the Premi Carles Riba in 1984 and Premi Màrius Torres in 1997, and she won the Premi Vicent Andrés Estellés in 1987.

== Works ==
=== Poetry ===
- Trilogia:
  - Una cançó per a ningú i Trenta diàlegs inútils, Barcelona: Proa, 1984
  - Aquelles cordes del vent, Barcelona: Proa, 1987
  - I encara. València: Eliseu Climent|Eliseu Climent, Editor / Edicions 3i4, 1987
- Écume fêlée
- Au bout des os au bout des mots, 1989.
- Passarel•les/Mosaïques. Barcelona: Cafè Central, 1992
- Versió original. València: Germania, 1996
- Sorra de Temps Absent. Lleida: Pagès Editors, 1998
- Postals no escrites. Barcelona: Proa, 2001

=== Prose ===
- "A dins a fora", Barceldones. Barcelona: Edicions de l'Eixample, 1989

==== Essay ====
- "La poesia japonesa moderna", Revista de Catalunya, 1988, pp. 131–150

=== Translations ===
From French language

- Marguerite Yourcenar: Obra negra [L'Œuvre au noir] Barcelona: Proa, 1984

From Japanese language

- Poesia japonesa contemporània, with Naoyuki Sawada. Barcelona: Proa, 1988

To Japanese :

- Poesia catalana contemporània, with Naoyuki Sawada. Tokyo: Shichosha, 1988

== Plastic works ==
- Nora Ancarola i Lola Donaire i Abancó (curadores): Felícia Fuster, obra plàstica. Fundació Felícia Fuster, 2008
