= An Early Martyr and Other Poems =

Book by William Carlos Williams

First edition of An Early Martyr and Other Poems, 1935

An Early Martyr and Other Poems is a book of poetry by the American poet William Carlos Williams. It was originally published in New York City by The Alcestis Press in 1935.

The collection includes poems such as "An Early Martyr" (for which the entire book is named), "Flowers By The Sea", "Proletarian Portrait", and the often anthologized "The Yachts". It also serves as a companion piece for another collection of Williams's poetry, Adam & Eve & The City, published a year later in 1936.
