= Dejan Stojanović =

Serbian poet and journalist (born 1959)

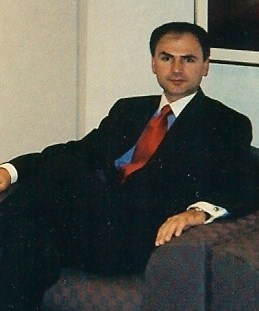
- Stojanović in Chicago in 2003
- Born: 11 March 1959 (age 67); Peć, Yugoslavia
- Occupation: Poet
- Writing career
- Language: Serbian, English
- Period: 1978–present
- Genre: poetry

Dejan Stojanović (Serbian Cyrillic: Дејан Стојановић, pronounced [dějan stojǎːnoʋitɕ]; born 11 March 1959) is a Serbian American poet, writer, essayist, philosopher, businessman, and former journalist. His poetry is characterized by a recognizable system of thought, and poetic devices that border on philosophy and a highly reflective overall tone. According to critic Petar V. Arbutina, "Stojanović belongs to the small and autochthonous circle of poets who have been the main creative and artistic force of the Serbian poetry in the last several decades."

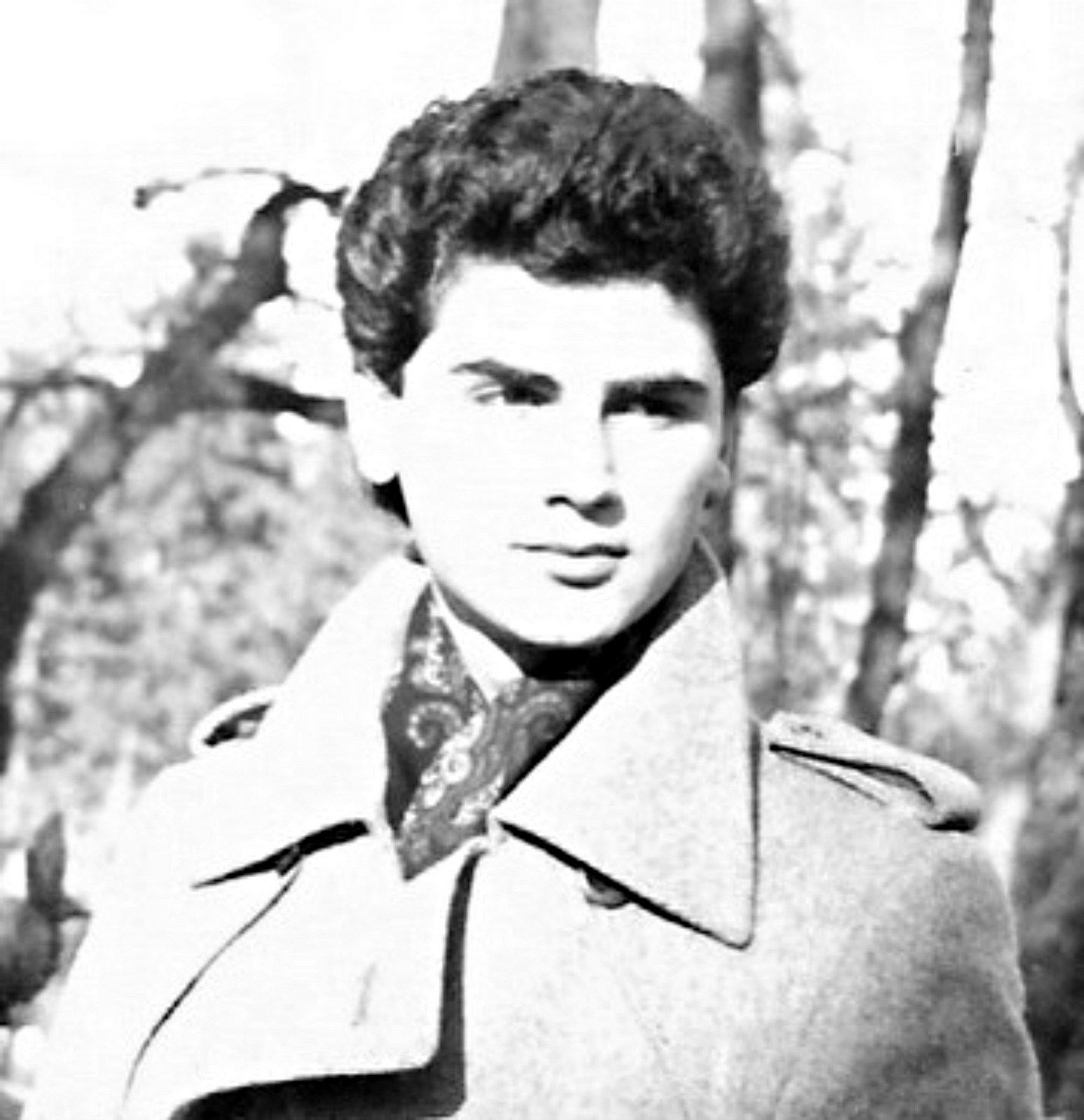
Dejan Stojanović, Belgrade, 1981

== Early life ==
Dejan Stojanović was born on 11 March 1959 in Peć, Autonomous District of Kosovo and Metohija, PR Serbia, FPR Yugoslavia. In 1972, he moved with his family to Sutomore, near Bar, Montenegro, where he completed his secondary education. He attended the University of Pristina at Kosovo. While he was predominantly interested in philosophy and the arts during his youth, he earned a degree in law.

== Writing background ==
=== Poetry ===
He began to write poetry in the late seventies and kept his work private for three to four years, after which he published his poems in literary magazines in the former Yugoslavia. Serbian magazines in which his work was published include Stremljenja (English translation: Trends) and Jedinstvo (English translation: Unity) in Priština, and Gradina in Niš. By 1983, he became a member of a literary club (Karagač) in his hometown of Peć. During this time, he was named secretary and later promoted to president of the club. In this role, he conducted interviews with local artists from Kosovo.

In his early adulthood, Stojanović developed a philosophical system of ideas that dealt primarily with metaphysical questions and the structure of the universe. He wrote several hundred pages in his notebooks exploring these ideas, along with essays on language and literature. In 1999, shortly after the war in Kosovo ended, these manuscripts, along with his library of more than a thousand books (carefully chosen for years), were lost due to a fire. His books, along with his manuscripts, were held temporarily in his brother's office in the center of downtown Peć.

=== Publishing ===
In 1990, Stojanović established a private publishing firm known as Metoh (English translation: the church's land). While the organization was located in Peć, the firm planned to publish a literary magazine in Kosovo. The firm's staff included writers from Belgrade, one of whom was Alek Vukadinović, a Serbian poet who supported Stojanović's plan to publish a magazine. While Stojanović's first book of poetry, Krugovanje (English translation: Circling) was ready for publication in 1983, it was not published until 1993. During those ten years, several poems that were initially planned for inclusion in the book had been replaced by newer poems, which had been written between 1983 and 1986. The last poem in the book had actually been written in Chicago, in 1991.

=== Journalism ===
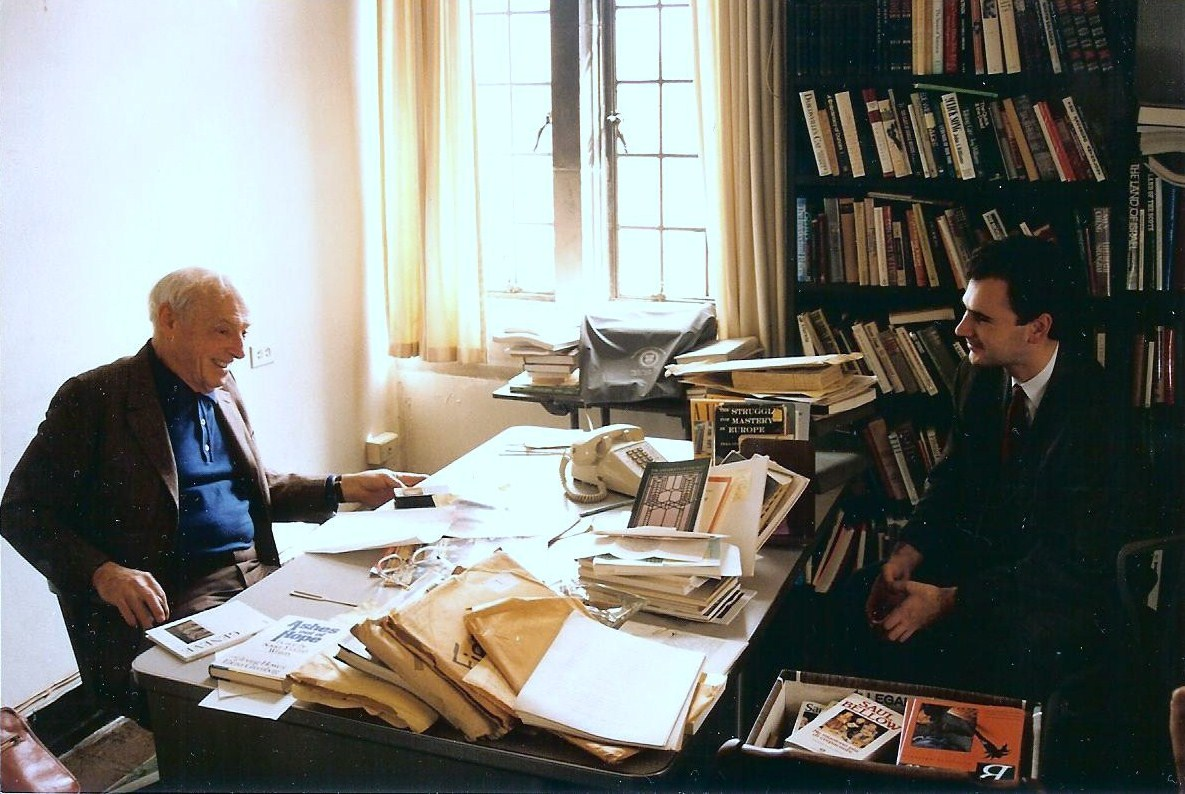
Saul Bellow and Dejan Stojanović, University of Chicago, 1992

In early 1990, Stojanović joined the writing staff of Serbian magazine, Pogledi (English translation: Viewpoints). At this time, he began a series of interviews with several Serbian writers in Belgrade, including Momo Kapor, Alek Vukadinović, and Nikola Milošević. During his second visit to Paris in May and June 1990, he interviewed Ljuba Popović, Petar Omčikus, Miloš Šobajić, and Jacques Claude Villard. In December 1990, he went to the US as a foreign correspondent, planning to stay six months to a year. During this time, he conducted interviews with prominent American writers, including Nobel Laureate Saul Bellow, Charles Simic, and Steve Tesich. He did not return to his homeland in summer 1991, when the Yugoslav Wars started in the former Yugoslavia, and has been living in Chicago since 1990. In honor of his series of interviews published in Conversations, published in 1999 by Književna reč of Belgrade, Stojanović received the Rastko Petrović Award, presented by the Association of Writers of Serbia.

=== Style ===
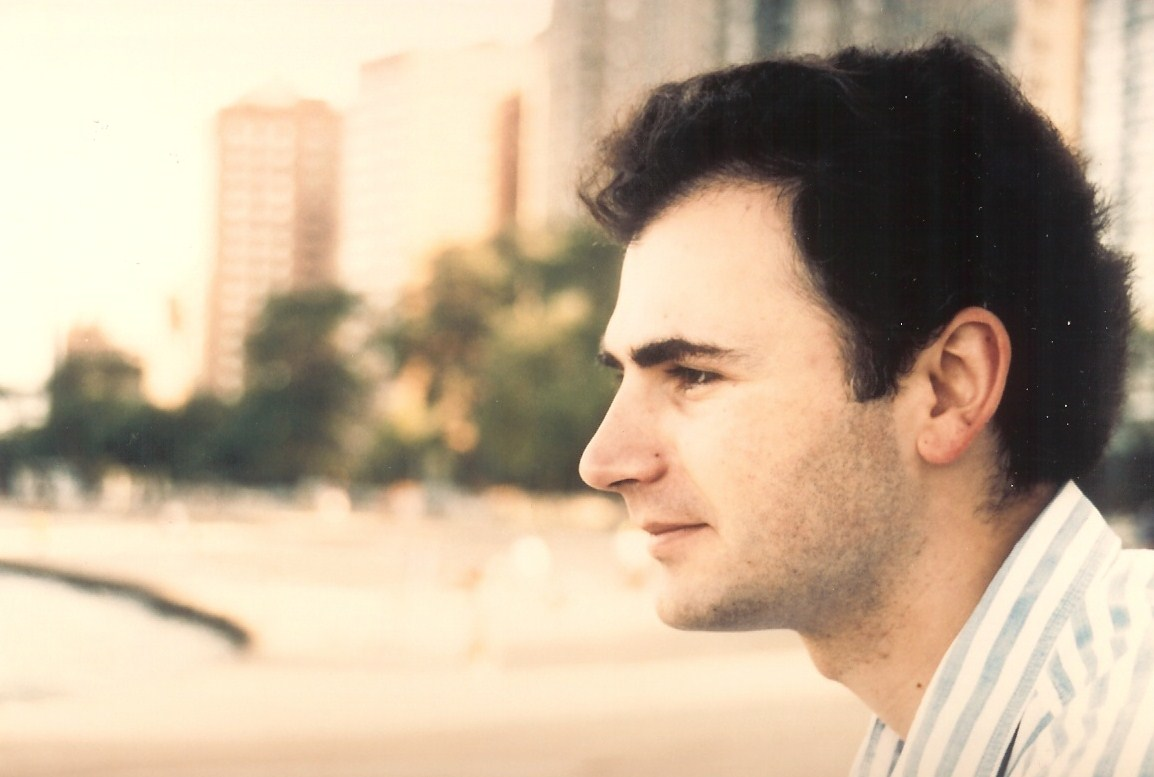
Dejan Stojanović, Chicago, 1991

Stojanović’s poetry collections are characterized by sequences of compact, dense poems, simple yet complex in carefully organized overall structure, and that is why some more visibly than others appear as long poems. This is especially characteristic of the books, The Sign and its Children, The Shape, and The Creator (Znak I njegova deca, Oblik, Tvoritelj ), in which, with a relatively small number of words repeated in different contexts, Stojanović built his own poetic cosmogony. For that reason, writer and critic, David Kecman, described him as a cosmosophist.

In his poems, he covers the smallest and the largest topics with equal attention, often juxtaposing them to the level of paradox and absurdity, gradually building new perspectives and meanings that are not only poetic either in origin or in purpose. Some themes and preoccupations, be they stones or galaxies, are present in all of his books and it can be said that his poetry books are, in themselves, long poems and that all of them serve as ingredients of a hyper-poetry book that is still in the making.

He used many poetic forms never used before in Serbian poetry and also created some new forms. "If elegance is represented by simplicity, then these are some of the most elegant verses imaginable," Branko Mikasinovich stated.

== Published works ==
The majority of Stojanović's poems, initially written in Serbian and compiled into six volumes of poetry, have been translated into English and a selection of his poems has been translated into French.

Poetry

- (1993) Krugovanje: 1978–1987; English translation: Circling: 1978–1987, Pub: Narodna knjiga, Alpha University, Belgrade
- (1998) Krugovanje – 2nd edition; English translation: Circling: 1978–1987 – 2nd edition, Pub: Narodna knjiga, Alpha University, Belgrade
- (1999) Sunce sebe gleda; English translation: The Sun Watches the Sun, Pub: Književna reč, Belgrade
- (2000) Znak i njegova deca; English translation: The Sign and its Children, Pub: Prosveta, Belgrade
- (2000) Oblik; English translation: The Shape, Pub: Gramatik, Podgorica; republished in English by New Avenue Books (14 July 2012)
- (2000) Tvoritelj, English translation: The Creator, Pub: Narodna knjiga, Alpha University, Belgrade
- (2000) Krugovanje – 3rd edition; English translation: Circling – 3rd edition, Pub: Narodna knjiga, Alpha University, Belgrade
- (2007) Ples vremena; English translation: Dance of Time, Pub: Konras, Belgrade

Interviews

- (1999) Conversations, Pub: Književna reč, Belgrade

English translations from Serbian

- (21 May 2012) Circling: 1978-1987, Pub: New Avenue Books. ASIN B0089VHNCA (ebook)
- (13 June 2012) The Sun Watches the Sun, Pub: New Avenue Books. ASIN B008BCY988 (ebook)
- (17 June 2012) The Creator, Pub: New Avenue Books. ASIN B008CCH646 (ebook)
- (11 July 2012) The Sign and Its Children, Pub: New Avenue Books. ASIN B008KFP1WY (ebook)
- (14 July 2012) The Shape, Pub: New Avenue Books. ASIN B008LGAFUK (ebook)
