= Circling: 1978–1987 =

1993 poetry collection by Dejan Stojanović

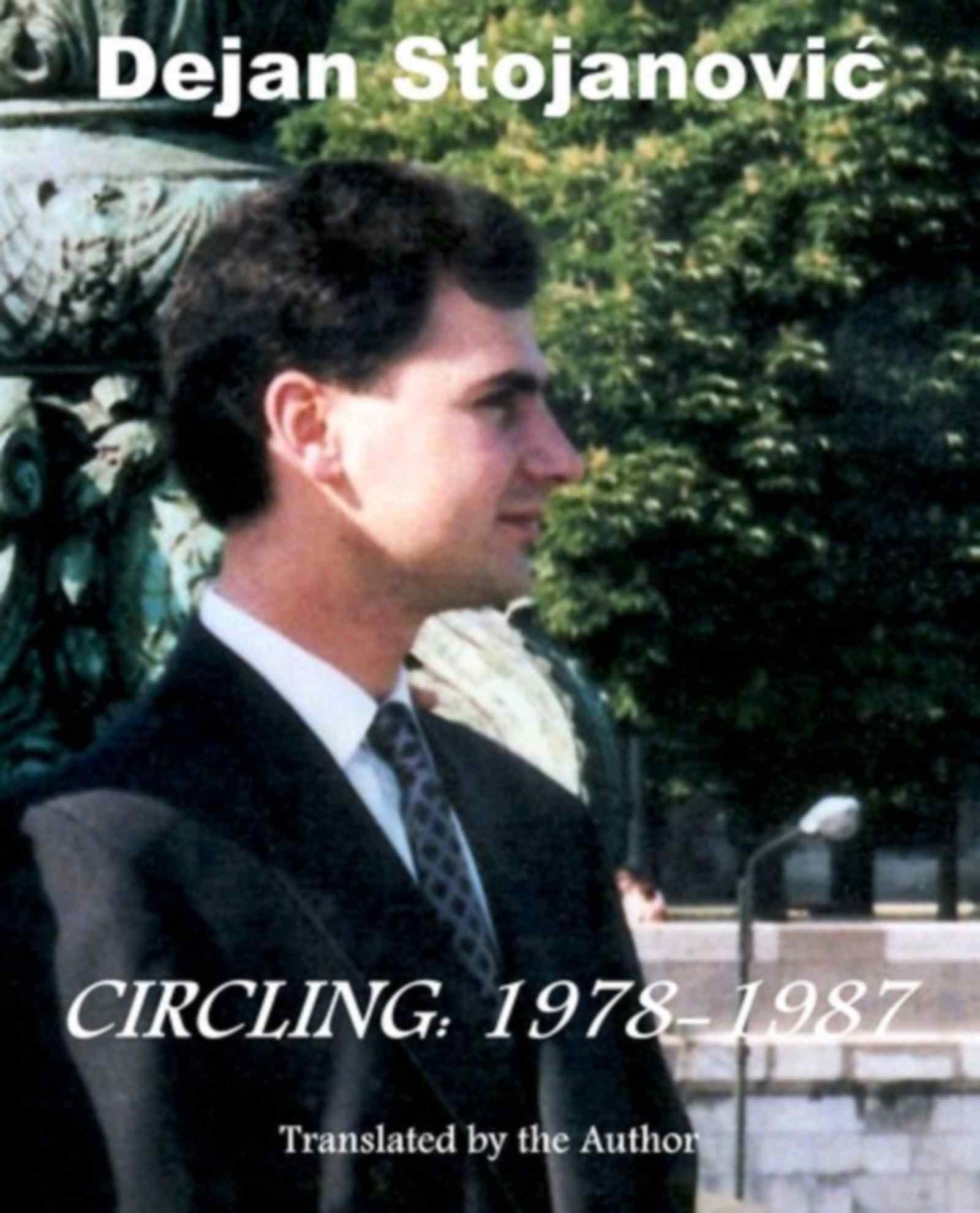
Circling 1978–1987, 2012

Circling: 1978–1987 (Krugovanje) is a 1993 poetry collection by the Serbian-American poet Dejan Stojanović (1959). It contains 56 poems in six sequences: "Recircling", "Light Bugs", "A Conversations with Atoms", "A Grain", "A Warden with no Keys", and "Darkness Is Waiting". Sequence, "A Grain", was added to the third edition published in 2000 by Narodna knjiga–Alfa, Beograd.

Specific, surprisingly original, outside the collectively nurtured sensibilities and fashionable trends, Stojanović is an extraordinary example of creative individualism in a generation that nourished such individualism the least. For that reason, the book Circling is not only an example of an extraordinary poetic achievement, which represents a strong encouragement to the important branch of Serbian poetry, but is also an announcement of a moral and spiritual project – a project that belongs to the tradition of Serbian poetry and thought in the best sense of the word.
