= The Shape (poetry collection) =

Poetry collection by Dejan Stojanović

The Shape (Oblik, 2000) is a collection of poetry by the Serbian-American poet Dejan Stojanović (1959). The book contains 46 poems in six sequences: "Home of the Shape," "Happiness of Atoms," "Bells," "Pit of the Stone," "Wonders," and "Big Chamber."
