= The Sign and Its Children =

Poetry collection by Dejan Stojanović

The Sign and Its Children (Znak i njegova deca, 2000) is a collection of poetry by the Serbian-American poet Dejan Stojanović (1959). The book contains 43 poems in five sequences: "The Supreme Sign," "The Sign and Nothing," "Sign Face," "A Word and a Sign," and "The Sign and the Dream."
