= The Creator (poetry collection) =

2000 book by Dejan Stojanović

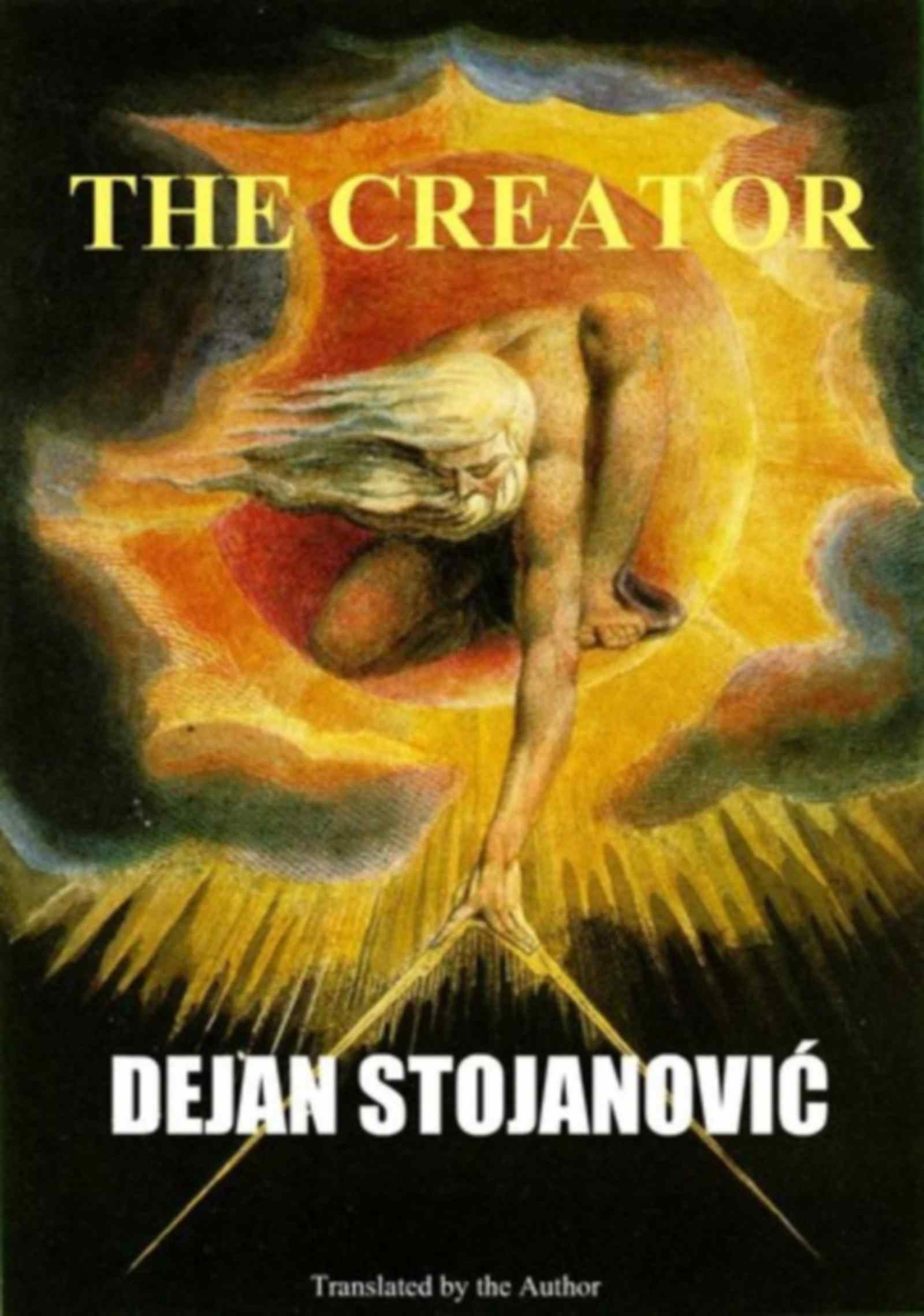
The Creator, 2012

The Creator (Tvoritelj, 2000) is a collection of poetry by the Serbian-American poet Dejan Stojanović (1959). The book, originally written in Serbian, contains 62 poems in nine sequences: "The Light-Bearer", "Forest of the Universe", "A Talk of Fire", "The Whisper of Eternity", "A Smiling Sky", "Thought and Flight", "Same and Change", "The Dream Chamber", and "Nostalgic Elements".
