= Jack Gilbert =

American poet and writer 1925-2012

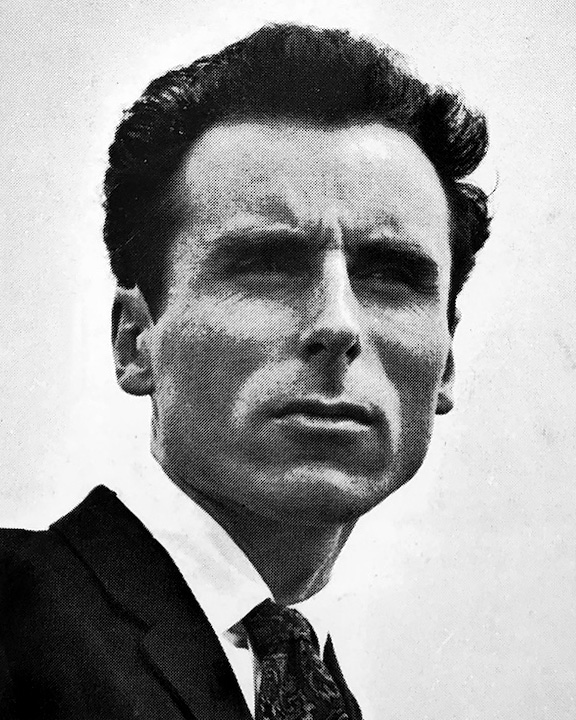
- Born: February 17, 1925; Pittsburgh, Pennsylvania, U.S.
- Died: November 13, 2012 (aged 87); Berkeley, California, U.S.
- Education: University of Pittsburgh (BA); San Francisco State University (MA)
- Occupations: Poet, writer

Signature
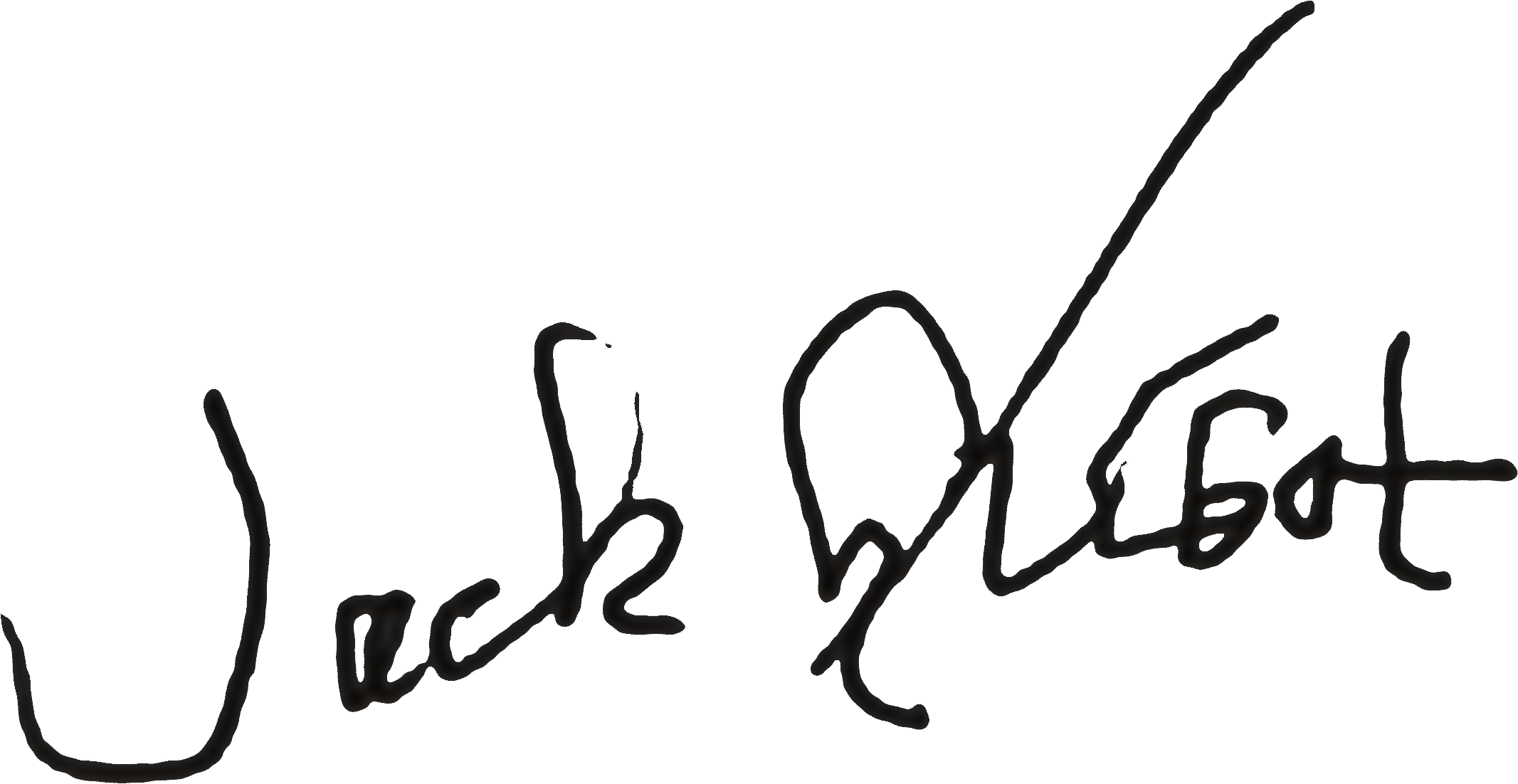

Jack Gilbert (February 17, 1925 – November 13, 2012) is an American poet. Gilbert was acquainted with Jack Spicer and Allen Ginsberg, both prominent figureheads of the Beat Movement, but is not considered a Beat Poet; he described himself as a "serious romantic." Over his five-decade-long career, he published eight full collections of poetry.

== Early life and education ==
Born and raised in the Pittsburgh, Pennsylvania, neighborhood of East Liberty, he attended Peabody High School, but failed out before earning a degree. Gilbert then worked as a door-to-door salesman, an exterminator, and a steelworker.

Despite having no high school degree, Gilbert applied to the University of Pittsburgh and due to a clerical error was admitted. During these college years he and his classmate Gerald Stern developed a serious interest in poetry and writing. He graduated in 1954.

Gilbert received his master's degree from San Francisco State University in 1963.

== Career ==
After college, Gilbert went to Paris and worked briefly at the Herald Tribune before moving to Italy. Gilbert spent two years there before moving to New York and then to San Francisco, where his life as a poet began.

His work has been distinguished by simple lyricism and straightforward clarity of tone, as well as a resonating control over his emotions: “We look up at the stars and they are / not there. We see memory / of when they were, once upon a time. / And that too is more than enough.” His first book of poetry, Views of Jeopardy (1962), won the Yale Younger Poets Prize and was nominated for the Pulitzer Prize, and Gilbert was quickly recognized.

He then retreated from his earlier activity in the San Francisco poetry scene, where he had participated in Jack Spicer's Poetry as Magic workshop, and, in 1964, moved to Europe. Living on a Guggenheim Fellowship, he was invited to tour 15 countries as a lecturer on American Literature for the U.S. State Department. He then lived briefly in England, Denmark, and Greece before returning to San Francisco in 1967.

His books of poetry were few and far between; however he continuously maintained his writing and contributed to The American Poetry Review, Genesis West, The Quarterly, Poetry, Ironwood, The Kenyon Review, and The New Yorker. Gilbert was the 1999-2000 Grace Hazard Conkling writer-in-residence at Smith College.

For several months in the Spring of 1964, He was a poet in Residence at Juniata College in Huntingdon, Pennsylvania.

Gilbert was also a visiting professor and writer-in-residence at the University of Tennessee in 2004. Author Elizabeth Gilbert, who discovered Jack Gilbert when she succeeded him in the same writing chair, declared, "He became the poet laureate of my life."

On April 15, 2013, it was announced that Gilbert's Collected Poems was a finalist for the 2013 Pulitzer Prize in Poetry. The Pulitzer jury's citation read:

a half century of poems reflecting a creative author’s commitment to living fully and honestly and to producing straightforward work that illuminates everyday experience with startling clarity.

== Personal life ==
Much of Gilbert's work is about his relationships with women. While in Italy, he met Gianna Gelmetti, a romantic partner who appears frequently in his work. The relationship ended after a year. Gilbert was a close friend of the poet Linda Gregg, whom he met when she was nineteen and his student in San Francisco, and with whom he was in a relationship for six years. Of the poet, Gregg once said, "All Jack ever wanted to know was that he was awake—that the trees in bloom were almond trees—and to walk down the road to get breakfast. He never cared if he was poor or had to sleep on a park bench."

He was also in a significant long-term relationship with the poet Laura Ulewicz during the late fifties and early sixties in San Francisco. Ulewicz was an influence on his early work; and his first book was dedicated to her. Gilbert was married to Michiko Nogami, another former student and a Japanese language instructor 21 years his junior, about whom he wrote many of his poems. Nogami died of cancer at the age of 36, in 1982. Gilbert died on November 13, 2012, in Berkeley, California. He was 87.

== Awards ==
- 1962 Yale Series of Younger Poets Competition for Views of Jeopardy
- 1964 Guggenheim Fellowship
- 1983 Stanley Kunitz Prize for Monolithos
- 1983 the American Poetry Review Prize for Monolithos
- 1983 finalist for the Pulitzer Prize for Poetry for Monolithos
- 1994 Lannan Literary Award for Poetry
- 2005 National Book Critics Circle Award for Refusing Heaven
- 2013 finalist for the Pulitzer Prize for Poetry for Collected Poems

== Poetry collections ==
- Views of Jeopardy Yale University Press, 1962
- Monolithos Graywolf Press, 1984, ISBN 9780915308422
- Kochan (1984), A limited edition chapbook of nine poems, two of which were later republished in The Great Fires: Poems 1982-1992; seven of the poems have not been otherwise published, including "Nights and Four Thousand Mornings," the longest poem Gilbert has published
- The Great Fires: Poems 1982-1992 Knopf, 1994
- Refusing Heaven Knopf, 2005
- Tough Heaven: Poems of Pittsburgh Pond Road Press, 2006
- Transgressions: Selected Poems Bloodaxe, 2006
- The Dance Most of All Knopf, 2010
- Collected Poems Knopf, 2012

== Novels ==
Gilbert wrote two erotic novels with Jean Maclean which were published by the short-lived Danish Olympia Press under the pseudonym Tor Kung:

- My Mother Taught Me (1964) From the book jacket: "This is the tale of Lars, a Swedish boy, raised in an all-male orphanage without ever seeing even pictures of women, adopted into a new household with enthusiastic siblings and an energetic foster-mother."
- Forever Ecstasy (1968) From the book jacket: "An amazing story about schoolboys, led by Paul and the devious but cowardly Rick, who at the end of the school year find themselves holding a young geometry teacher... right where they want her."

== Anthologies ==
/* Anthology */ "19 New American Poets of the Golden Gate": editor. poet Philip Dow, Harcourt Brace Jovanovich (1984).

 Gilbert's essay "Real Nouns" appears, as do select poems.
