= W. H. Auden bibliography =

This is a bibliography of books, plays, films, and libretti written, edited, or translated by the Anglo-American poet W. H. Auden (1907–1973). See the main entry for a list of biographical and critical studies and external links. Dates are dates of publication or performance, not of composition.

== Publications by W. H. Auden ==
In the list below, works reprinted in the Complete Works of W. H. Auden are indicated by footnote references.

=== Books and selected pamphlets ===
- Poems (London, 1928; privately printed; different contents from 1930 volume with the same title) (dedicated to Christopher Isherwood).
- Poems (London, 1930; second edn., seven poems substituted, London, 1933; includes poems and Paid on Both Sides: A Charade) (dedicated to Christopher Isherwood).
- The Orators: An English Study (London, 1932, verse and prose; slightly revised edn., London, 1934; revised edn. with new preface, London, 1966; New York 1967) (dedicated to Stephen Spender).
- The Dance of Death (London, 1933, play) (dedicated to Robert Medley and Rupert Doone).
- Poems (New York, 1934; contains Poems [1933 edition], The Orators [1932 edition], and The Dance of Death).
- The Dog Beneath the Skin (London, New York, 1935; play, with Christopher Isherwood) (dedicated to Robert Moody).
- The Ascent of F6 (London, 1936; 2nd edn., 1937; New York, 1937; play, with Christopher Isherwood) (dedicated to John Bicknell Auden).
- Look, Stranger! (London, 1936, poems; US edn., On This Island, New York, 1937) (dedicated to Erika Mann)
- Spain (London, 1937; pamphlet poem).
- Letters from Iceland (London, New York, 1937; verse and prose, with Louis MacNeice) (dedicated to George Augustus Auden).
- On the Frontier (London, 1938; New York, 1939; play, with Christopher Isherwood) (dedicated to Benjamin Britten).
- Selected Poems (London, 1938) (selected by Auden from previously published work)
- Education: Today - and Tomorrow (London, 1939; journalism, with T. C. Worsley)
- Journey to a War (London, New York, 1939; verse and prose, with Christopher Isherwood) (dedicated to E. M. Forster).
- Another Time (London, New York 1940; poetry) (dedicated to Chester Kallman).
- Some Poems (London, 1940)) (not selected by Auden)
- The Double Man (New York, 1941, poems; UK edn., New Year Letter, London, 1941) (Dedicated to Elizabeth Mayer).
- For the Time Being (New York, 1944; London, 1945; two long poems: "The Sea and the Mirror: A Commentary on Shakespeare's The Tempest", dedicated to James and Tania Stern, and "For the Time Being: A Christmas Oratorio", in memoriam Constance Rosalie Auden [Auden's mother]).
- The Collected Poetry of W.H. Auden (New York, 1945; includes new poems) (dedicated to Christopher Isherwood and Chester Kallman).
- The Age of Anxiety: A Baroque Eclogue (New York, 1947; London, 1948; verse; won the 1948 Pulitzer Prize for Poetry) (dedicated to John Betjeman).
- The Enchafèd Flood (New York, 1950; London, 1951; prose) (dedicated to Alan Ansen).
- Collected Shorter Poems, 1930-1944 (London, 1950; similar to 1945 Collected Poetry) (dedicated to Christopher Isherwood and Chester Kallman).
- Nones (New York, 1951; London, 1952; poems) (dedicated to Reinhold and Ursula Niebuhr)
- Mountains. (1954) (pamphlet edition of a single poem, included in The Shield of Achilles)
- The Shield of Achilles (New York, London, 1955; poems; won the 1956 National Book Award for Poetry) (dedicated to Lincoln and Fidelma Kirstein).
- The Old Man's Road (New York, 1956; pamphlet with poems, all included in Homage to Clio).
- W. H. Auden: A Selection by the Author (Harmondsworth, 1958; New York, 1959, as Selected Poetry of W. H. Auden) (includes some new revisions to previously published poems)
- Homage to Clio (New York, London, 1960; poems) (dedicated to E. R. and A. E. Dodds).
- The Dyer's Hand (New York, 1962; London, 1963; essays) (dedicated to Nevill Coghill).
- About the House (New York, London, 1965; poems) (dedicated to Edmund and Elena Wilson).
- Collected Shorter Poems 1927-1957 (London, 1966; New York, 1967) (dedicated to Christopher Isherwood and Chester Kallman).
- Selected Poems (London, 1968) (includes some new revisions to previously published poems)
- Collected Longer Poems (London, 1968; New York, 1969).
- Secondary Worlds (London, New York, 1969; prose) (dedicated to Valerie Eliot).
- City Without Walls and Other Poems (London, New York, 1969) (dedicated to Peter Heyworth).
- A Certain World: A Commonplace Book (New York, London, 1970; quotations with commentary) (dedicated to Geoffrey Gorer).
- Academic Graffiti (London, New York, 1971; poems) (in memoriam Ogden Nash).
- Epistle to a Godson and Other Poems (London, New York, 1972) (dedicated to Orlan Fox).
- Forewords and Afterwords (New York, London, 1973; essays) (dedicated to Hannah Arendt).
- Thank You, Fog: Last Poems (London, New York, 1974) (dedicated to Michael and Marny Yates).

==== Posthumous books ====
Note: These are works that Auden did not intend to publish

- "The Prolific and the Devourer" (1939, prose; unfinished book; published in magazine form 1981, in book form, New York, 1993).
- Lectures on Shakespeare (1946–47, reconstructed and ed. by Arthur Kirsch, Princeton, 2001).

=== Anthologies edited by Auden ===
- The Poet's Tongue (2-vol and 1-vol edns., with John Garrett, London, 1935; introduction reprinted).
- The Oxford Book of Light Verse (Oxford, 1938; introduction reprinted) (dedicated to E. R. Dodds).
- The Portable Greek Reader (New York, 1948; introduction reprinted).
- Poets of the English Language (5 vols., with Norman Holmes Pearson; New York, 1950; London, 1952; introduction reprinted).
- The Faber Book of Modern American Verse (London, 1956; US edn., The Criterion book of Modern American Verse); introduction reprinted.
- The Viking Book of Aphorisms (with Louis Kronenberger; New York, 1964; UK edn., The Faber Book of Aphorisms); introduction reprinted.
- Nineteenth-Century British Minor Poets (New York, 1966; UK edn. Nineteenth-Century Minor Poets).

=== Film scripts and opera libretti ===
- Coal Face (1935, closing chorus for GPO Film Unit documentary).
- Negroes (1935, narrative for GPO Film Unit documentary); completed 1938 (without Auden's participation) as God's Chillun.
- Night Mail (1936, narrative for GPO Film Unit documentary, not published separately except as a program note).
- The Way to the Sea (1936, narrative for Strand Films documentary).
- Paul Bunyan (1941, libretto for operetta by Benjamin Britten; not published until 1976).
- The Rake's Progress (1951, with Chester Kallman, libretto for an opera by Igor Stravinsky).
- Elegy for Young Lovers (1956, with Chester Kallman, libretto for an opera by Hans Werner Henze).
- The Bassarids (1961, with Chester Kallman, libretto for an opera by Hans Werner Henze based on The Bacchae of Euripides).
- Runner (1962, documentary film narrative for National Film Board of Canada)
- Love's Labour's Lost (1973, with Chester Kallman, libretto for an opera by Nicolas Nabokov, based on Shakespeare's play).

=== Non-fiction ===
- "Gresham's School" in Graham Greene (ed.) The Old School: Essays by Divers Hands (London: Jonathan Cape, 1934)

=== Edited selections of individual authors ===
- A Selection from the Poems of Alfred, Lord Tennyson (New York, 1944; UK edn. Tennyson: An Introduction and a Selection, London, 1946); introduction reprinted.
- Selected Prose and Poetry of Edgar Allan Poe (New York, 1950; rev. edn., 1956); introduction reprinted.
- The Living Thoughts of Kierkegaard (New York, 1952; UK edn., Kierkegaard: Selected and Introduced by W. H. Auden, London, 1955); introduction reprinted.
- A Choice of De La Mare's Verse (London, 1963); introduction reprinted.
- Louis MacNeice, Selected Poems (London, 1964); preface reprinted.
- George Gordon, Lord Byron, Selected Poetry and Prose (New York, 1966); introduction reprinted.
- G. K. Chesterton: A Selection from His Non-Fictional Prose (London, 1970); introduction reprinted.

=== Translations ===
- The Magic Flute (New York, 1956; London, 1957; with Chester Kallman, English version of Emanuel Schikaneder's original German libretto to the Mozart opera Die Zauberflöte) (dedicated to Anne and Irving Weiss).
- Don Giovanni (New York, 1961; with Chester Kallman, English translation of Lorenzo da Ponte's original Italian libretto to the Mozart opera).
- Goethe, J. W. von. Italian Journey, tr. by W. H. Auden and Elizabeth Mayer (London, New York, 1963); introduction reprinted.
- The Elder Edda: A Selection, tr. by W. H. Auden and Paul B. Taylor (London, 1969; New York, 1970).

=== Editions published after Auden's death ===
- Collected Poems (1976, new edns. 1991, 2007, ed. by Edward Mendelson; Auden's final revisions).
- The English Auden: Poems, Essays, and Dramatic Writings, 1927-1939 (1977, ed. by Edward Mendelson).
- Selected Poems (1979, expanded edn. 2007, ed. by Edward Mendelson; includes earlier versions and discarded poems).
- Plays and Other Dramatic Writings, 1927-1938 (1989, first vol. of The Complete Works of W. H. Auden, ed. by Edward Mendelson).
- Libretti and Other Dramatic Writings, 1939-1973 (1993, second vol. of The Complete Works of W. H. Auden, ed. by Edward Mendelson).
- Tell Me the Truth About Love: Ten Poems (1994, later UK edns. have 15 poems).
- Juvenilia: Poems 1922-1928 (1994, ed. by Katherine Bucknell; expanded edn. 2003).
- As I Walked Out One Evening: Songs, Ballads, Lullabies, Limericks, and Other Light Verse (1995, ed. by Edward Mendelson).
- Prose and Travel Books in Prose and Verse: Volume I, 1926-1938 (1997, third vol. of The Complete Works of W. H. Auden, ed. by Edward Mendelson).
- W.H. Auden: Poems selected by John Fuller, (2000).
- Prose, Volume II: 1939-1948 (2002, fourth vol. of The Complete Works of W. H. Auden, ed. by Edward Mendelson).
- The Sea and the Mirror: A Commentary on Shakespeare's "The Tempest" (2003, ed. by Arthur Kirsch).
- Prose, Volume III: 1949-1955 (2008, fifth vol. of The Complete Works of W. H. Auden, ed. by Edward Mendelson).
- Prose, Volume IV: 1956-1962 (2010, sixth vol. of The Complete Works of W. H. Auden, ed. by Edward Mendelson).
- The Age of Anxiety (2011, ed. by Alan Jacobs)
- Prose, Volume V: 1963-1968 (2015, seventh vol. of The Complete Works of W. H. Auden, ed. by Edward Mendelson).
- Prose, Volume VI: 1969-1973 (2015, eighth vol. of The Complete Works of W. H. Auden, ed. by Edward Mendelson).
