= Bucolics (Auden) =

Bucolics is a sequence of poems by W. H. Auden written in 1952 and 1953. The seven poems in the sequence are: "Winds", "Woods, "Mountains", "Lakes", "Islands", "Plains", and "Streams".

The sequence was first published in book form in Auden's book The Shield of Achilles (1955), together with a parallel sequence "Horae Canonicae."
