= September 1, 1939 =

Poem by W. H. Auden

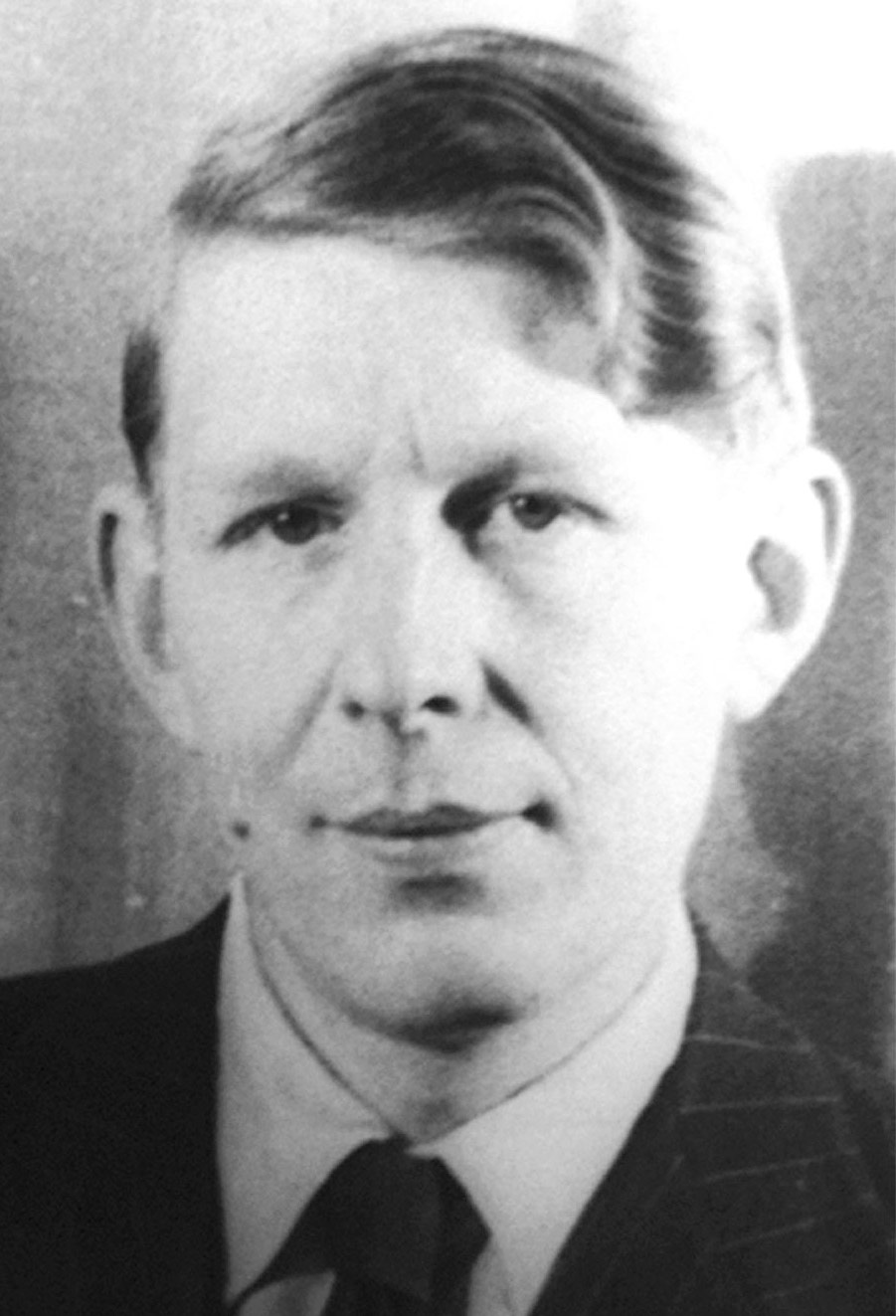
Auden in 1939

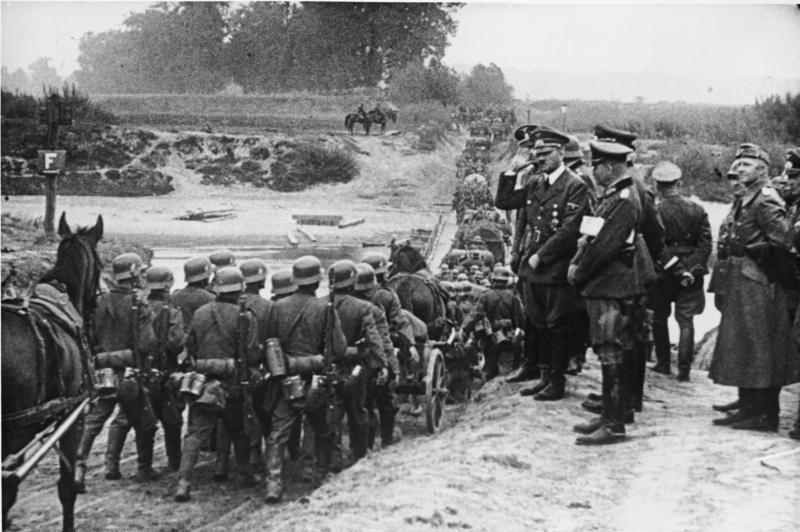
German dictator Adolf Hitler observes German soldiers marching into Poland, September 1939

"September 1, 1939" is a poem by W. H. Auden written shortly after the German invasion of Poland, which would mark the start of World War II. It was first published in The New Republic issue of 18 October 1939, and in book form in Auden's collection Another Time (1940).

== Description ==
The poem deliberately echoes the stanza form of W. B. Yeats's "Easter, 1916", another poem about an important historical event; like Yeats's poem, Auden's moves from a description of historical failures and frustrations to a possible transformation in the present or future.

Until the two final stanzas, the poem briefly describes what he considers to be the social and personal pathology that has brought about the outbreak of war: first the historical development of Germany "from Luther until now," next the internal conflicts in every individual person that correspond to the external conflicts of the war. Much of the language and content of the poem echoes that of Carl Jung's Psychology and Religion (1938).

The final two stanzas shift radically in tone and content, turning to the truth that the poet can tell, "We must love one another or die," and to the presence in the world of "the Just" who exchange messages of hope. The poem ends with the hope that the poet, like "the Just", can "show an affirming flame" in the midst of the disaster.

== History of the text ==
Auden wrote the poem in the first days of World War II while visiting the father of his lover Chester Kallman in New Jersey (according to a communication of Kallman to friends, see Edward Mendelson, Later Auden, p. 531).

Even before printing the poem for the first time, Auden deleted two stanzas from the latter section, one of them proclaiming his faith in an inevitable "education of man" away from war and division. The two stanzas are printed in Edward Mendelson's Early Auden (1981).

Soon after writing the poem, Auden began to turn away from it, apparently because he found it flattering to himself and to his readers. When he reprinted the poem in The Collected Poetry of W. H. Auden (1945) he omitted the famous stanza that ends "We must love one another or die." In 1957, he wrote to the critic Laurence Lerner, "Between you and me, I loathe that poem" (quoted in Edward Mendelson, Later Auden, p. 478). He resolved to omit it from his further collections, and it did not appear in his 1966 Collected Shorter Poems 1927–1957.

In the mid-1950s Auden began to refuse permission to editors who asked to reprint the poem in anthologies. In 1955, he allowed Oscar Williams to include it complete in The New Pocket Anthology of American Verse, but altered the most famous line to read "We must love one another and die." Later he allowed the poem to be reprinted only once, in a Penguin Books anthology Poetry of the Thirties (1964), with a note saying about this and four other early poems, "Mr. W. H. Auden considers these five poems to be trash which he is ashamed to have written."

== Reception ==
Despite Auden's disapproval, the poem became famous and widely popular. E. M. Forster wrote, "Because he once wrote 'We must love one another or die' he can command me to follow him."

"Daisy" advertisement

A close echo of the line "We must love one another or die," spoken by Lyndon Johnson in a recording of one of his speeches, was used in the famous Johnson campaign commercial "Daisy" during the 1964 campaign. In the ad, the image of a young girl picks petals from a daisy, then is replaced by the image of a nuclear explosion, which serves as an apocalyptic backdrop to the audio of Johnson's speech. Johnson's version of the line, inserted into a speech by an unidentified speechwriter, was "We must either love each other, or we must die."

A reference to the poem titles Larry Kramer's 1985 play The Normal Heart.

In 2001, immediately after the 11 September 2001 attacks, the poem was read (with many lines omitted) on National Public Radio and was widely circulated and discussed for its relevance to recent events. Charles T. Matthews from the University of Virginia commented on the prescience of the 1939 poem reflecting the cultural sorrow experienced in response to 11 September by quoting the last two couplets of Auden's third stanza of the poem:

The enlightenment driven away,
The habit-forming pain,
Mismanagement and grief,
We must suffer them all again.

The American historian Paul N. Hehn used the phrase "A Low, Dishonest Decade" for the title of his book A Low, Dishonest Decade: The Great Powers, Eastern Europe, and the Economic Origins of World War II, 1930-1941 (2002) in which he argues that "economic rivalries ... formed the essential and primary cause of World War II."
