= Another Time (book) =

1940 book by W.H. Auden

- First US edition (Random House)
- Author: W. H. Auden
- Language: English
- Genre: Poetry
- Published: 1940
- Media type: Print
- OCLC: 1339262
- Dewey Decimal: 821.91
- LC Class: PR6001.U4

Another Time is a book of poems by W. H. Auden, published in 1940.

This book contains Auden's shorter poems written between 1936 and 1939, except for those already published in Letters from Iceland and Journey to a War. These poems are among the best-known of his entire career.

The book is divided into three parts, "People and Places", "Lighter Poems", and "Occasional Poems".

"People and Places" includes "Law, say the gardeners, is the sun", "Oxford", "A. E. Housman", "Edward Lear", "Herman Melville", "The Capital", "Voltaire at Ferney", "Orpheus", "Musée des Beaux Arts", "Gare du Midi", "Dover", and many other poems.

"Lighter Poems" includes "Miss Gee", "O tell me the truth about love", "Funeral Blues", "Calypso", "Roman Wall Blues", "The Unknown Citizen", "Refugee Blues", and other poems.

"Occasional Poems" includes "Spain 1937", "In Memory of W. B. Yeats", "September 1, 1939", "In Memory of Sigmund Freud", and other poems.

The book is dedicated to Chester Kallman.
