= Clerihew =

Whimsical, four-line biographical poem

A clerihew (/ˈklɛrɪhjuː/ KLERR-ih-hyoo) is a whimsical, four-line biographical poem of a type invented by Edmund Clerihew Bentley. The first line is the name of the poem's subject, usually a famous person, and the remainder puts the subject in an absurd light or reveals something unknown or spurious about the subject. The rhyme scheme is $\mathrm{AABB}$, and the rhymes are often forced. The line length and metre are irregular. Bentley invented the clerihew in school and then popularized it in books. One of his best known is this (1905):

Sir Christopher Wren
Said, "I am going to dine with some men.
If anyone calls
Say I am designing St Paul's."

== Form ==
A clerihew has the following properties:

- It is biographical and usually whimsical, showing the subject from an unusual point of view; it mostly pokes fun at famous people
- It has four lines of irregular length and metre for comic effect
- The rhyme structure is $\mathrm{AABB}$; the subject matter and wording are often humorously contrived in order to achieve a rhyme, including the use of phrases in Latin, French and other non-English languages
- The first line contains, and may consist solely of, the subject's name. According to a letter in The Spectator in the 1960s, Bentley said that a true clerihew has to have the name "at the end of the first line", as the whole point was the skill in rhyming awkward names.

Clerihews are not satirical or abusive, but they target famous individuals and reposition them in an absurd, anachronistic or commonplace setting, often giving them an over-simplified and slightly garbled description.

== Practitioners ==
The form was invented by and is named after Edmund Clerihew Bentley. When he was a 16-year-old pupil at St Paul's School in London, the lines of his first clerihew, about Humphry Davy, came into his head during a science class. Together with his schoolfriends, he filled a notebook with examples. The first known use of the word in print dates from 1928. Bentley published three volumes of his own clerihews: Biography for Beginners (1905), published as "edited by E. Clerihew"; More Biography (1929); and Baseless Biography (1939), a compilation of clerihews originally published in Punch illustrated by the author's son Nicolas Bentley.

G. K. Chesterton, a friend of Bentley, was also a practitioner of the clerihew and one of the sources of its popularity. Chesterton provided verses and illustrations for the original schoolboy notebook and illustrated Biography for Beginners. Other serious authors also produced clerihews, including W. H. Auden, and it remains a popular humorous form among writers and the general public. Among contemporary writers, the satirist Craig Brown has made considerable use of the clerihew in his columns for The Daily Telegraph.

== Examples ==
Bentley's first clerihew, published in 1905, was written about Sir Humphry Davy:

Sir Humphry Davy
Abominated gravy.
He lived in the odium
Of having discovered sodium.

The original poem had the second line "Was not fond of gravy"; but the published version has "Abominated gravy".

Other clerihews by Bentley include:

George the Third
Ought never to have occurred.
One can only wonder
At so grotesque a blunder.

and

John Stuart Mill,
By a mighty effort of will,
Overcame his natural bonhomie
And wrote Principles of Political Economy.

W. H. Auden's Academic Graffiti (1971) includes:

Sir Henry Rider Haggard
Was completely staggered
When his bride-to-be
Announced, "I am She!"

Satirical magazine Private Eye noted Auden's work and responded:

W. H. Auden
Suffers from acute boredom
But for his readers he's got some merry news
He's written a collection of rather bad clerihews.

Alan Turing, one of the founders of computing, was the subject of a clerihew written by the pupils of his alma mater, Sherborne School in England:

Turing
Must have been alluring
To get made a don
So early on.

A clerihew appreciated by chemists is cited in Dark Sun by Richard Rhodes, and regards the inventor of the thermos bottle (or Dewar flask):

Sir James Dewar
Is a better man than you are
None of you asses
Can liquefy gases.

The version in Biography for Beginners says "condense" rather than "liquefy".

Dark Sun also features a clerihew about the German-British physicist and Soviet nuclear spy Klaus Fuchs:

Fuchs
Looks
Like an ascetic
Theoretic

In 1983, Games magazine ran a contest titled "Do You Clerihew?" The winning entry was:

Did Descartes
Depart
With the thought
"Therefore I'm not"?

== Other uses of the form ==
The clerihew form has also occasionally been used for non-biographical verses. Bentley opened his 1905 Biography for Beginners with an example, entitled "Introductory Remarks", on the theme of biography itself:

The Art of Biography
Is different from Geography.
Geography is about Maps,
But Biography is about Chaps.

The third edition of the same work, published in 1925, includes a "Preface to the New Edition" in 11 stanzas, each in clerihew form. One stanza runs:

On biographic style
(Formerly so vile)
The book has had an effect
Greater than I could reasonably expect.

== See also ==
- Balliol rhyme
- Double dactyl
- Light verse
- Limerick
