= About the House =

- First edition (US)
- Author: W. H. Auden
- Language: English
- Genre: Poetry
- Publisher: Random House
- Publication date: 1965
- Publication place: United States

About the House is a book of poems by W. H. Auden, published in 1965 by Random House (first published in England by Faber & Faber in 1966).

The book is in two unnumbered parts, "Thanksgiving for a Habitat", a sequence of poems about Auden's house in Kirchstetten, Austria, and a miscellaneous group of poems headed "In and Out". Almost all the poems were written between 1960 and 1964.

The "Thanksgiving for a Habitat" sequence includes 15 poems in different forms, some followed by a "Postscript" generally in haiku form. The sequence includes, among other poems, "The Cave of Making", "The Geography of the House", "Tonight at Seven-Thirty", "The Cave of Nakedness", and "The Common Life". One poem in the sequence, "Grub First, Then Ethics", was written in 1958 and was published in Auden's previous book Homage to Clio under the title "On Installing an American Kitchen in Lower Austria".

The poems in the "In and Out" section include "A Change of Air", "You", "Et in Arcadia Ego", "On the Circuit", "After Reading a Child's Guide to Modern Physics", and "Whitsunday in Kirchstetten".

This was the first of Auden's books to include the haiku form, which he used in many poems for the rest of his career.

The book is dedicated to Edmund and Elena Wilson.
