= Symphony No. 2 (Bernstein) =

Piece by Leonard Bernstein

- The Age of Anxiety
- by Leonard Bernstein
- Title page of the score
- Based on: W. H. Auden's "The Age of Anxiety"
- Composed: 1948–1949, revised 1965
- Dedication: Serge Koussevitzky
- Performed: April 8, 1949
- Movements: two parts
- Scoring: piano; orchestra

Leonard Bernstein's Symphony No. 2 The Age of Anxiety is a piece for orchestra and solo piano. The piece was composed from 1948 to 1949 in the United States and Israel, and was revised in 1965. It is titled after W. H. Auden's eponymous poem, and dedicated to Serge Koussevitzky.

== History ==
A friend is claimed to have given Bernstein the idea to write music based on The Age of Anxiety in a letter:

What do you think of the 'Anxiety' idea? There is so much musical-subtlety in it, and those various metres brought about by the different roads the couples take and their differing means of transportation, to say nothing of the moods, and the separateness that becomes Oneness under alcohol and/or libidinal urges. You mentioned it being good ballet material, yes, but I think, first, it should be composed as music by itself and therefore protect it from being too obvious program music, and then if some clever choreographer can put the musical composition to work, with what added quality good music may give to the themes and material, well and good. I would rather have 'it' in the concert hall, where it can be less 'handled' than in the ballet school where many different talents brush it up. It's too good a thing for many hands.

When beginning to write the piece, Bernstein stated that Auden's poem was "one of the most shattering examples of pure virtuosity in the history of English poetry" and that a "composition of a symphony based on The Age of Anxiety acquired an almost compulsive quality." After Auden's "The Age of Anxiety" won the Pulitzer Prize in 1948, Bernstein praised it, saying "When I first read the book I was breathless." Bernstein worked on the composition "in Taos, Philadelphia, Richmond, Mass., in Tel-Aviv, in planes, in hotel lobbies…" Though called a symphony, "The Age of Anxiety" does not follow the traditional symphonic form: instead of a conventional four-movement, exclusively orchestral work, Bernstein scored it for solo piano and orchestra, and divided the piece into six subsections – mirroring Auden’s text – split equally into two parts that are performed without pause. He completed the piece on March 20, 1949 in New York City. Dissatisfied with the ending of the composition, Bernstein revised it in 1965 to firmly establish his idea for the true ending where the final movement "The Masque" was added before the Epilogue. The work was dedicated to and commissioned by Serge Koussevitzky who was preparing to end his 25-year career conducting the Boston Symphony Orchestra.

== Instrumentation and structure ==
The symphony is composed for an orchestra containing 2 flutes, piccolo, 2 oboes, English horn, 2 clarinets, bass clarinet, 2 bassoons, contrabassoon, 4 horns, 3 trumpets, 3 trombones, tuba, timpani, percussion, 2 harps, celesta, pianino (upright piano), strings, and solo piano.

Structurally, there are two parts, each comprising three sections. Each movement is named after the six sections of Auden's poem, trying to mirror the moods and events in the poem.

=== Part One ===
1. The Prologue: Lento moderato
2. The Seven Ages: Variations 1–7
  1. L'istesso tempo
  2. Poco più mosso
  3. Largamente, ma mosso
  4. Più mosso
  5. Agitato
  6. Poco meno mosso
  7. L'istesso tempo
3. The Seven Stages: Variations 8–14
  8. Molto moderato, ma movendo
  9. Più mosso (Tempo di Valse)
  10. Più mosso
  11. L'istesso tempo
  12. Poco più vivace
  13. L'istesso tempo
  14. Poco più vivace

In accordance with Auden’s “Prologue,” the poem begins with four lonely individuals (three men and one woman) in a bar, each reflecting on his or her own disquietude while acknowledging the presence of the others. Musically, a plaintive clarinet duet signals the beginning of the characters’ journey, with a long descending scale signaling their retreat to a shared unconscious. It is here that the characters begin discussing life in each of their own points of view, moving onto “The Seven Ages.” Here, Bernstein composed a set of variations that are unique in the fact that, rather than all sharing the same melody or thematic material like a traditional theme and variations would, each variation plays on the material from the variation immediately before it. This gives the work a constantly shifting landscape that is reminiscent of the past but progressing for the future. It then proceeds to “The Seven Stages,” that tells the tale of the same “group [embarking] on a collective dream, one of even more heightened awareness, attempting to rediscover the deeper meaning of their own humanity.” Emulating the characters conflicting ideals and desires, Bernstein weaves a frantic and confused musical tapestry that shows the characters trying desperately to find what they are searching for, but falling short, though becoming closer because of their experience. This brings the first half of the piece to a dramatic and abrupt close.

=== Part Two ===
1. The Dirge: Largo
2. The Masque: Extremely Fast
3. The Epilogue: Adagio; Andante; Con moto

The second half of the piece opens with “The Dirge”, a theme, first introduced by the solo piano, based on a 12-tone row that gives way to a contrasting middle section, reminiscent of Brahms’ romanticism. In the poem, the four travel to the women’s apartment by cab, mourning the loss of their fallen father ("Dad") figure. Once they arrive at the apartment, the four are determined to have a party, but refuse to take the attention away from any of the others, and all opt to turn in for the night. “The Masque” is a speedy piano solo that is accompanied by syncopated rhythms in various percussion instruments. The main theme is the tune from Ain't Got No Tears Left, a song cut from On The Town. This song was also separately recorded with the famous singer Cleo Laine. The piano is joined by the rest of the orchestra for a time before it drops out entirely, becoming “traumatized” as it tries to come to terms with its “escapist living.” The energy from “The Masque” fades and the entire orchestra comes in to repeat the bars it had been playing before, now joined by the strings and starting “The Epilogue.” Here, echoes of the “Prologue” resound while the new 4 note theme is contemplated by the reminiscent piano soloist. Answering the orchestra’s calls for clarity, a solo piano cadenza, added in 1965, revisits the journey of the characters, and is taken up by the full orchestra, which builds to a radiant close. The listener, as well as the reader, finds that “what is left, it turns out, is faith.”

== Premiere ==
The work was premiered on April 8, 1949, with Serge Koussevitzky conducting the Boston Symphony Orchestra and the composer at the piano. It was met with good reviews and received a repeat performance in Tanglewood that summer. It was recorded for the first time by Columbia Records in 1950 with Bernstein himself conducting the New York Philharmonic with pianist Lukas Foss as the soloist. A typical performance of the work lasts approximately 35 to 40 minutes.

W.H. Auden, who reportedly did not care for ballet and thought it a "very, very minor art", appears not to have appreciated the translation of his poem into other media. After the Symphony's premiere he commented that it "really has nothing to do with me. Any connections with my book are rather distant."

== Revised version ==
Bernstein revised the concerto in 1965 and added "The Masque", which is the jazz movement as the intoxicated apartment gathering. It is scored as relatively lightly, featuring piano plus percussion, harp, and bass, which helps it feel like a jazz club. The "Epilogue" follows after.

== Ballet ==
Jerome Robbins choreographed a ballet to this symphony in 1950 for the New York City Ballet. The choreography has been lost. The work was premiered at the New York City Center Theater in 1950 and showcased the artistry of Jerome Robbins, Todd Bolender, Francisco Moncion and Tanaquil Le Clercq.

John Neumeier used the score for a ballet premiered by Ballet West in 1991. Liam Scarlett created another version for the Royal Ballet in 2014.
