= The Enchafèd Flood =

1950 collection of essays by W. H. Auden

The Enchafèd Flood: or, The Romantic Iconography of the Sea
- First US edition
- Author: W. H. Auden
- Publication date: 1950

The Enchafèd Flood: or, The Romantic Iconography of the Sea is a book of three lectures by W. H. Auden, first published in 1950.

The book contains Auden's 1949 Page-Barbour Lectures at the University of Virginia. The three lectures are titled "The Sea and the Desert", "The Stone and the Shell", and "Ishmael–Don Quixote".

The theme of the book is the sensibility of romanticism, especially in its search for escape from responsibility and community. It deals with poems by Coleridge, Byron, Hopkins, Blake, but above all with Herman Melville's Moby-Dick, which is analysed with psychoanalytical tools (especially used to interpret the main characters of the novel) and with an analogical interpretation of such symbols as the sea, the ship, the stone, and the shell.

The book is dedicated to Alan Ansen. The title comes from a line in Act 2, Scene 1 of Shakespeare's Othello.
