= Academic Graffiti =

1971 book of clerihews by W. H. Auden

- First UK edition (publ. Faber & Faber)
- Author: W.H. Auden
- Publication date: 1971

Academic Graffiti is a book of clerihews by W. H. Auden, with illustrations by Filippo Sanjust. It was published in 1971.

Auden began writing in 1950 the short comic poems on literary and historical figures that he would later collect in Academic Graffiti. A selection of these clerihews appeared in his 1960 book Homage to Clio, and the complete collection appeared in this 1971 volume.
