= Poems (Auden) =

Three separate collections of the poetry of W. H. Auden

1930 edition

Poems is the title of three separate collections of the early poetry of W. H. Auden. Auden refused to title his early work because he wanted the reader to confront the poetry itself. Consequently, his first book was called simply Poems when it was printed by his friend and fellow poet Stephen Spender in 1928; he used the same title for the very different book published by Faber and Faber in 1930 (2nd ed. 1933), and by Random House in 1934, which also included The Orators and The Dance of Death.

The privately printed 1928 edition of Poems was of "about 45 copies", as stated on its limitation page; probably only around 30 copies were actually printed. It is one of the great rarities of twentieth century literature.

The 1930 commercially published edition of Poems appeared from Faber and Faber in 1930, having been accepted by T. S. Eliot; it was printed in an edition of 1,000 copies. Only a small number of the poems in the 1928 version survived into the 1930 volume. Written in a gnomic, seemingly obscure style, the poems and the play Paid on Both Sides included with them, were extraordinarily influential. The compression of their style, their presentation of a personality "frustrate and vexed" that could be seen as a metaphor for the zeitgeist of a country—plainly England, struck a wholly new, modernist note. Not allusive like Eliot's The Waste Land (1922), the numbered poems in the volume, as well as the play, were as difficult and rich as that work but, unlike it, seemed to come from a person speaking in a private but significant code. The impression derives from the density of rhetorical device, but some of it also comes from the author's stoic, detached attitude toward his own intense emotional life. Some of these mannerisms were copied in the work of Spender and Cecil Day-Lewis. For this reason critics dubbed these contemporary writers, who also saw England in parlous condition, as "the Auden generation."

In 1933, when Poems was reprinted, Auden replaced seven of the poems in the 1930 edition with poems that he had written during the year 1930, after completing the 1930 version of the book. Auden revised or dropped many of the poems in the 1933 edition for the collections and selections that he prepared in the 1940s and later.

The 1934 edition, published by Random House, was Auden's first published book in the United States. The publisher included all three of the books that Auden had published in the UK in this volume.

For a few readers and critics, such as Randall Jarrell, the 1930 and 1933 versions remain Auden's greatest achievement.
