= The Sea and the Mirror =

Poem by W. H. Auden

"The Sea and the Mirror: A Commentary on Shakespeare's The Tempest" is a long poem by W. H. Auden, written 1942–44, and first published in 1944. Auden regarded the work as "my Ars Poetica, in the same way I believe The Tempest to have been Shakespeare's."

The poem is a series of dramatic monologues spoken by the characters in Shakespeare's play after the end of the play itself. These are rendered in a variety of verse forms from villanelles, sonnets, sestinas, and finally Jamesian prose, the forms corresponding to the nature of the characters. For example, Ferdinand addresses Miranda in a sonnet, a form traditionally amenable to expressions of love.

The poem begins with a "Preface" ("The Stage Manager to the Critics"), followed by Part I, "Prospero to Ariel"; Part II, "The Supporting Cast, Sotto Voce", spoken by individual characters in the play, each followed by a brief comment on the character of Antonio; and Part III, Caliban to the Audience, spoken by Caliban in a prose style modelled on that of the later work of Henry James. A "Postscript" ("Ariel to Caliban, Echo by the Prompter") closes the work. The poem is dedicated to Auden's friends James and Tania Stern.

It was first published in 1944 together with Auden's long poem, his Christmas Oratorio "For the Time Being" in a book also titled For the Time Being.

A critical edition with introduction and copious textual notes by Arthur Kirsch was published in 2003 by Princeton University Press. Auden's burgeoning relationship with Shakespeare's corpus can also be seen in his Lectures on Shakespeare, also edited by Kirsch, delivered 1946/7 and diligently reconstructed from student notes.

== Part III "Caliban to the Audience" ==
Caliban to the Audience, the longest section by far of the work, is a prose poem in the style of Henry James. In it, Auden reflects on the nature of the relationship of the author (presumably Shakespeare) to the audience of The Tempest, the paradoxes of portraying life in art, and the tension of form and freedom. Edward Mendelson asserts that Auden took six months to arrive at its form but the result was a work the poet favoured above all others for many years.

The poem itself is in three parts with a short introduction, where the "so good, so great, so dead author" is asked to take a curtain call, and being unable to do so, Caliban stands in his place to take the questions.

The first section is a meditation on the dramatic arts, in various personifications, the Muse for the dramatic arts, Caliban as the Real World, and Ariel as the Poetic world.

The second section is an address to Shakespeare on behalf of his characters, reflecting on the "Journey of Life" – "the down-at-heels disillusioned figure" and the desire for either personal or artistic freedom, with the disastrous results if either is attained.

The third section is a meditation on the paradox of life and art, with mutually exclusive goals, where the closer to Art you come, the farther from Life you go, and vice versa. Caliban says he "[feels] something of the serio-comic embarrassment of the dedicated dramatist, who, in representing to you your condition of estrangement from the truth, is doomed to fail the more he succeeds, for the more truthfully he paints the condition, the less clearly can he indicate the truth from which it is estranged." This owes much to Auden's reading in Christian (existentialist) philosophy at this time. The section ends with a coda of sorts, with the paradox resolved through faith in "the Wholly Other Life".

It was important that the style be as artificial as possible to suggest Caliban's unnaturalness, neither able to leave the island with the others, nor, because the curtain has fallen in this meta-theatrical medium, remain put. He occupies a limbo of sorts which Auden identified in letters as specifically sexual, having been conceived as "the Prick".
