= Refugee Blues =

1939 poem by W. H. Auden

"Refugee Blues" is a poem by W. H. Auden, written in 1939, one of a number of poems Auden wrote in the mid-to-late-1930s in blues and other popular metres, for example, the meter he used in his love poem "Calypso", written around the same time. The poem comments on the condition of Jewish refugees from Nazi Germany in the years before World War II, especially the indifference and antagonism they faced when seeking asylum in the democracies of the period. In some later editions of Auden's poetry, the poem is not identified by name but is the first of ten poems grouped together in "Ten Songs", which also includes the above-mentioned "Calypso".

In abbreviated form it was set to music by Elisabeth Lutyens in Two Songs by W.H. Auden (1942)
