= Forewords and Afterwords =

1973 nonfiction book by W. H. Auden

- First UK edition
- Author: W. H. Auden
- Language: English
- Publication date: 1973

Forewords and Afterwords is a 1973 non-fiction book by W. H. Auden.

The book contains 46 essays by Auden on literary, historical, and religious subjects, written between 1943 and 1972 and slightly revised for this volume.

The essays include Auden's introduction to The Portable Greek Reader (retitled "The Greeks and Us" in this volume), his introduction to the anthology The Protestant Mystics, his introduction to an edition of Shakespeare's Sonnets, reviews and introductions on Goethe, Sydney Smith, Kierkegaard, Edgar Allan Poe, Tennyson, Wagner, Lewis Carroll, A. E. Housman, Cavafy, Kipling, Thomas Mann, Dag Hammarskjöld, and others, and a partly autobiographical essay, "As It Seemed To Us".

The contents were selected by Edward Mendelson and the book is dedicated to Hannah Arendt.
