= Epistle to a Godson =

First UK edition (publ. Faber & Faber)

Epistle to a Godson and other poems is a book of poems by W. H. Auden, published in 1972.

This book was the last book of poems that Auden completed in his lifetime; its successor, Thank You, Fog was left unfinished at his death.

The poems included in the book were written mostly in 1968–1971. They include, in addition to the title poem, "Natural Linguistics", "Doggerel by a Senior Citizen", "Old People's Home", "Talking to Dogs", "Talking to Mice", and "Talking to Myself".

The titular poem, first published in 1969 in the New York Review of Books, is dedicated to Philip Spender, while the book as a whole is dedicated to Orlan Fox, "whom Auden had first met as an undergraduate at Columbia University in 1959".
