= Michael Yates (television designer) =

British theatre, opera and television designer

- Born: 20 July 1919
- Died: 28 November 2001 (aged 82)
- Occupation: Television production designer

Michael Yates (20 July 1919 – 28 November 2001) was a British theatre, opera, and television designer.

== Early life ==
A twin, and one of five sons born to James Yates, an English lawyer, Yates grew up in Brooklands, Sale, Cheshire. Yates was educated first at the Downs School near Malvern, where he learned painting from the arts master Maurice Feild. He was later associated with the Euston Road School and teacher at the Slade School of Art, who remained a lifelong friend of Yates. At the Downs, he also met the poet W. H. Auden, then an English master at the school, who became a lifelong friend.

During 1933–38, Yates was a pupil at the Bryanston School, where he was honoured as head boy. In 1938–1941, he studied at the Yale School of Drama. He was admitted to the school by Allardyce Nicoll, when their mutual acquaintance Auden recommended Yates be admitted to Yale. At Yale, Yates began a lasting friendship with his fellow student — Owen Dodson (who was a poet and dramatist) and was also introduced to Dodson to Auden, initiating a lasting friendship between the two poets.

== World War II experiences ==
During World War II, Yates served with the Royal Marines in Crete where he was taken prisoner by the Germans and sent to a prison camp until the end of the war. In the camp he learned German by talking with the guards, and he designed the sets for the prisoners' productions of Macbeth and other plays, making highly imaginative use of the limited resources available to him.

The experience of designing in a prison camp seems to have liberated his imagination. He later wrote of his teenage years that "claustrophobic family life and the cocoon of public schools at that time" had made him what an acquaintance described as "a nice English schoolboy." But his adult work was imaginative and innovative.

== Postwar career ==
After the war, Yates returned to London where he lived and worked for the rest of life. He entered the theatrical world at the lowest rung of the ladder, serving tea in the Royal Opera House, Covent Garden, London. He later worked for the Carl Rosa Opera Company, where he began his adult work as a designer.

Yates left the Carl Rosa Company to join the BBC, where his more notable productions were Heidi (1953) and Troilus and Cressida (1954). He won a Guild of Television Producers and Directors award in 1954 for his BBC production of Amahl and the Night Visitors.

In 1955, he married Marny (Margaret) Yates, who had two sons from a previous marriage; the two sons lived with the Yates until adulthood.

In the early 1950s, BBC Television was not deeply committed to visual design, and seemed to Yates to be more concerned with efficiency than aesthetics in its production. In 1955, therefore, he welcomed the chance to become head of design at Associated-Rediffusion, one of new independent television companies in Britain, where the resources available to a designer were far more extensive. He continued to be head of design at Associated-Rediffusion's successor, Rediffusion, and then at London Weekend Television (LWT), which received the franchise for weekend broadcasting in London. He remained at LWT for the rest of his career.

At Associated-Rediffusion he initiated a costume department, with its own autonomous staff, establishing costume as a significant element in design. He proved to be an effective administrator, known for inspiring his staff and protecting their interests, while also keeping strict control over his department. He designed many notable productions, including a 1962 production of Sophocles' Elektra performed in Greek by the Piraikon Greek Tragedy Theatre Company that was broadcast throughout Europe; a 1964 production of A Midsummer Night's Dream that was re-shown at the National Film Theatre in 1994; and a production (shown in both the UK and the US) of Léonide Massine's ballet Laudes Evangelii which he staged in the cathedral at Perugia, and in preparation for which he sent members of his staff to interview the choreographer.

His many other television productions included Richard Whittington, Esquire, Benjamin Britten's The Turn of the Screw, Jean Cocteau's The Human Voice (1966), "A Man Inside" (1967), the series Lay Down Your Arms (1970), one episode of Upstairs, Downstairs (1972, with John Clements), the series New Scotland Yard (1972), The Death of Adolf Hitler (1973), the series Within These Walls (1974), the series The Awful Mr Goodall (1974), and Alan Bennett's Doris and Doreen (1978).

Through his work, he commissioned or advised on stage designs by many well-known English painters, notably John Piper.

== Later years ==
After retiring from LWT in 1979, Yates was a visiting teacher at the theatre department at the Croydon College of Art (now part of Croydon College), a governor of the Medway College of Design (now part of the University College for the Creative Arts at Canterbury, Epsom, Farnham, Maidstone and Rochester), and chairman of the Friends of Charing Cross Hospital. He devoted his last years to volunteer work at the Hospital, where he is remembered as a welcome and benevolent presence.

== Literary influence ==
Yates and his wife Marny were lifelong friends of Auden and Chester Kallman and visited them each summer in Italy and, after Auden left Italy, in Austria; the Yateses visited Kallman in Austria in 1974, the year after Auden died. Yates also wrote "Iceland, 1936", a memoir of his visit to Iceland with the Bryanston party, Auden, and MacNeice, for W. H. Auden: A Tribute, edited by Stephen Spender (1975).

== Sources ==
- Michael Yates, "Iceland, 1936", in W. H. Auden: A Tribute, ed. Stephen Spender (1973).
- Dennis Barker, "Michael Yates", The Guardian, 18 December 2001, p. 18.
- (Unsigned), "Michael Yates", The Times, London, 21 January 2002.
