= Thank You, Fog =

First US edition (publ. Random House)

Thank You, Fog: Last Poems by W. H. Auden is a posthumous book of poems by W. H. Auden, published in 1974.

The book contains poems written mostly in 1972 and 1973; after Auden's death in September 1973 it was prepared for publication by his literary executor Edward Mendelson, who also included an "antimasque" titled "The Entertainment of the Senses", written in 1973 by Auden and Chester Kallman as an interpolation in a planned production of James Shirley's masque Cupid and Death (1653); the antimasque was commissioned by the composer John Gardner.

The shorter poems in the book, in addition to the title poem, include "Aubade", "Unpredictable but Providential", "Address to the Beasts", "Archaeology", "No, Plato, No", "Nocturne", "A Thanksgiving", and "Lullaby". The book also includes two of the lyrics that Auden wrote for the musical comedy Man of La Mancha, which were rejected by the original librettist of that play.
