= Paid on Both Sides =

Play written by W. H. Auden

Paid on Both Sides: A Charade was the first dramatic work written by W. H. Auden. It was written in 1928 and published in 1930. It was performed in New York in 1931 and then at the Cambridge Festival Theatre on 12 February 1934 (seven months after Terence Gray departed) in a programme of "experiments conducted by Joseph Gordon Macleod" which also included Deirdre by W.B.Yeats and An Animation of a Lay of Horatius Cocles by Thomas Babington, Lord Macaulay.

For the Auden "charade" the actors in Cambridge were seated on chairs on both sides of the stage. The "actors" were Flavia du Pre, David Raven, Noel Iliff, Sanchia Robertson, Peter Hoar, Robert MacDermot, Don Gemmell, Else Bley, John Hamilton, David Marsh, John Izon, Clephan Bell, Garrett Jones, Diana Morgan, Cicely Nicks and Macleod as the "Chorus". The theatre programme described the content: "Two families (or classes or industries or nations) are at feud. The Lintzgarth side marries into the Nattrass side; but at the wedding the Nattrass mother, in revenge for the death of her elder son, incites her younger son to shoot the Lintzgarth bridegroom; and the peace and mutual toleration that had been promised are ruined by personal animosity." Lintzgarth and Nattrass are real places which Auden found in his exploration of the North Pennines and Alston Moor. The former is a house at Rookhope, the latter at Alston. The latter is also a family surname in the area.

Paid on Both Sides is a brief dramatic work that combines elements of Icelandic sagas, modern psychoanalysis, and English public-school culture. Auden wrote it in two versions, a brief first version written in mid-1928 that was published after his death, and a longer version, written later in the year, that was first published in The Criterion in 1930 (Auden's first publication outside of school and university magazines) and again in his 1930 volume of Poems.

The play is dedicated to Cecil Day-Lewis.
