= The Double Man (book) =

First edition (US)

The Double Man is a book of poems by W. H. Auden, published in 1941. The title of the UK edition, published later the same year was New Year Letter.

The Double Man begins with a verse "Prologue" ("O season of repetition and return"), followed by a long three-part philosophical poem in octosyllabic couplets, New Year Letter and an idiosyncratic set of "Notes" to the poem in prose and verse. These are followed by the sonnet sequence "The Quest" and a verse "Epilogue" ("Returning each morning from a timeless world"). The entire book was written in 1940, and indirectly records Auden's return to the Anglican Communion.

The book is dedicated to Elizabeth Mayer.
