= Peter Heyworth =

American-born British music critic and biographer

Peter Lawrence Frederick Heyworth (3 June 1921 – 2 October 1991) was an American-born British music critic and biographer. He wrote a two-volume biography of Otto Klemperer and was a prominent supporter of avant-garde music.

== Life and career ==
Peter Heyworth was born in the Lawrence Hospital, Bronxville, New York on 3 June 1921. He was the son of Lawrence Ormerod Heyworth (1890–1954), a prosperous commodity dealer born in Argentina, and his first wife Ella, née Stern (1891–1927), who was born in the US. The family moved to England when Heyworth was four. His mother died when he was six, and he was much influenced by her mother, a good pianist of Viennese Jewish family. He was educated at Charterhouse, and, after wartime service, Balliol College, Oxford (1947–1950) and the University of Göttingen (1950).

Heyworth's military service included a period in Vienna, which helped form his musical preferences, which favoured German rather than French music. His ambition to become a political or foreign correspondent was frustrated by poor health: he contracted tuberculosis and then Addison's disease. He joined the London weekly The Times Educational Supplement in 1952, and then another weekly, The Observer, under its chief music critic, Eric Blom, whom he succeeded in 1955. He was also a European musical correspondent and critic for The New York Times from 1960 to 1975.

Although lacking any formal musical education – he had great difficulty reading scores – Heyworth championed his preferences and attacked his bêtes noires with equal outspokenness. Both in print and in person, he had a reputation for expressing himself trenchantly. He reduced secretaries to tears, quarrelled with Sir Malcolm Sargent and Colin Davis, dismissed André Previn as "mediocre", provoked William Walton into writing music intended to upset him, and wrote so woundingly about Elisabeth Schwarzkopf that she permanently gave up singing at Covent Garden.

Heyworth's sympathies were with avant-garde music, and he objected to many new works in traditional musical form, maintaining that the Proms were "cluttered with a lot of second-rate works and a certain amount of sheer derivative drivel". He praised the works of Pierre Boulez, Karlheinz Stockhausen and Harrison Birtwistle, criticised Ralph Vaughan Williams for "heavy-handed heartiness" and being amateurish in his orchestration, was dismissive of Frederick Delius's music, lukewarm about Benjamin Britten's, and consistently hostile to Walton's.

Apart from his journalism, Heyworth was editor of a volume of Ernest Newman's writings, Berlioz, Romantic and Classic (1972), and author of Conversations with Klemperer (1973) and a two-volume biography, Otto Klemperer: His Life and Times. The first volume was published in 1983; reviewing it in The New York Times, John Rockwell described it as "one of the most informative, readable musical biographies ever written". The second volume was substantially complete at the time of Heyworth's death and was taken to publication in 1996 by John Lucas. Reviewing it in The Sunday Times, Hugh Canning called it "essential reading, not only for the even-handed way he analyses Klemperer's complex musical personality, but also for the richly detailed picture he paints of an era in music-making in which artistic values still counted for a great deal".

He was a friend of British-American poet W. H. Auden, who dedicated his book of poems City without Walls to Heyworth. The two had met in Berlin in 1964.

Heyworth retired from his post at The Observer in June 1991. He died of a stroke on 2 October of that year, while on holiday in Athens. He was unmarried; his long-term partner was Jochen Voigt. Heyworth was survived by a brother and three nephews.

== References and sources ==
=== Sources ===
- Kennedy, Michael (1989). Portrait of Walton. Oxford: Oxford University Press. ISBN 978-0-19-816705-1.
