= A Certain World =

- First UK edition
- Author: W. H. Auden
- Language: English
- Subject: Commonplace books
- Published: 1970 by Viking Press
- Publication place: United States
- Media type: Print
- Pages: 438
- ISBN: 0670209945
- OCLC: 87076
- LC Class: PN 6245 .A91

A Certain World: A Commonplace Book, by W. H. Auden, is an anthology of passages and quotations from other authors, selected by Auden, arranged alphabetically by subject. He called it "a sort of autobiography." Subjects include time, sin, and landscapes. It was published in 1970.
