= For the Time Being =

Poem by W. H. Auden

- First edition, published by Random House
- Author: W. H. Auden
- Language: English
- Published: 1944
- Publication place: USA

For the Time Being: A Christmas Oratorio, is a long poem by W. H. Auden, written in 1941 and 1942, and first published in 1944. It was one of two long poems included in Auden's book also titled For the Time Being, published in 1944; the other poem included in the book was "The Sea and the Mirror."

The poem is a series of dramatic monologues spoken by the characters in the Christmas story and by choruses and a narrator. The characters all speak in modern diction, and the events of the story are portrayed as if they occurred in the contemporary world.

Its mood is sombre regarding the future of the world, as seen in the following lines:

Reason will be replaced by Revelation. Instead of Rational Law, objective truths perceptible to any who will undergo the necessary intellectual discipline, Knowledge will degenerate into a riot of subjective visions ... Whole cosmogonies will be created out of some forgotten personal resentment, complete epics written in private languages, the daubs of schoolchildren ranked above the greatest masterpieces. Idealism will be replaced by Materialism. Life after death will be an eternal dinner party where all the guests are 20 years old. ... Justice will be replaced by Pity as the cardinal human virtue, and all fear of retribution will vanish. ... The New Aristocracy will consist exclusively of hermits, bums and permanent invalids. The Rough Diamond, the Consumptive Whore, the bandit who is good to his mother, the epileptic girl who has a way with animals will be the heroes and heroines of the New Age, when the general, the statesman, and the philosopher have become the butt of every farce and satire.

Auden wrote the poem to be set to music by Benjamin Britten, but it was far too long for this purpose, and Britten set only two fragments, including one ("Shepherd's Carol") that Auden dropped before the work was published. A 1952 radio broadcast of the work by BBC included music by Mátyás Seiber.

The poem is dedicated to the memory of Auden's mother, Constance Rosalie Bicknell Auden.
