= The Age of Anxiety =

1947 long poem by W. H. Auden

First edition (US) (publ. Random House)

The Age of Anxiety: A Baroque Eclogue (1947; first UK edition, 1948) is a long poem in six parts by W. H. Auden, written mostly in a modern version of Anglo-Saxon alliterative verse.

The poem deals, in eclogue form, with man's quest to find substance and identity in a shifting and increasingly industrialized world. Set in a wartime bar in New York City, Auden uses four characters – Quant, Malin, Rosetta, and Emble – to explore and develop his themes.

The poem won the Pulitzer Prize for Poetry in 1948.

A critical edition of the poem, edited by Alan Jacobs, was published by Princeton University Press in 2011.

== Influence ==
The poem inspired Leonard Bernstein's 1949 Symphony No. 2, also known as The Age of Anxiety.

The phrase "Age of Anxiety" was used in the titles of E. R. Dodds' book Pagan and Christian in an Age of Anxiety (1965), as well as Pete Townshend's novel The Age of Anxiety (2019).
