= On This Island =

1937 book by W. H. Auden

First edition (UK)

On This Island is a book of poems by W. H. Auden, first published under the title Look, Stranger! in the UK in 1936, then published under Auden's preferred title, On this Island, in the US in 1937. It is also the title of one of the poems in the collection.

The book contains thirty-one poems. The opening "Prologue" ("O Love the interest itself in thoughtless heaven") is followed by short and long poems including "Hearing of harvests", "O what is that sound", "Out on the lawn", "Brothers who when the sirens roar", "Love had him fast", "A shilling life", "Our hunting fathers", and others, ending with an "Epilogue" ("Certainly our city").

Originally, Auden had given it the preliminary title Thirty-One Poems. Auden's UK publisher, Faber & Faber asked him to supply a better title since neither of them liked it. However, since he was traveling in Iceland and was inaccessible, the publisher titled the book Look, Stranger! Auden disliked the title and asked his American publisher, Random House to title the book On This Island.

The book is dedicated to Erika Mann.

A song cycle of the same name by Benjamin Britten sets five of Auden's poems.
