= Secondary Worlds =

First UK edition (publ. Faber & Faber)

Secondary Worlds is a book of four essays by W. H. Auden, first published in 1968.

The four essays in the book are based on the four T. S. Eliot Memorial Lectures that Auden delivered at Eliot College of the University of Kent in Canterbury from 25 to 28 October 1967. The titles of the four lectures are: "The Martyr as Dramatic Hero" (held on 25 October 1967), "The World of the Saga" (original lecture title "The Saga Hero, or Epic & Social Realism", 26 October 1967), "The World of Opera" (original lecture title "The Mythical World of Opera", 27 October 1967), and "Words and the Word" (28 October 1967).

The title of the book is taken from J. R. R. Tolkien's essay "On Fairy Stories".

The book is dedicated to Valerie Eliot.
