= The Dog Beneath the Skin =

Play by W. H. Auden and Christopher Isherwood

First US edition (Random House)

The Dog Beneath the Skin, or Where is Francis? A Play in Three Acts, by W. H. Auden and Christopher Isherwood, was the first Auden–Isherwood collaboration and an important contribution to English poetic drama in the 1930s. It was published in 1935 and first performed by the Group Theatre in 1936.

The play describes the quest by the hero Alan Norman to find Sir Francis Crewe, the missing heir of Honeypot Hall in Crewe. The quest takes him on a satiric journey through Europe and England, accompanied by a large dog, who proves to be Sir Francis in disguise. Auden and Isherwood wrote two versions of the end of the play. In Isherwood's version, which appears in the printed text, Sir Francis denounces the villagers and leaves to join a vaguely defined revolutionary movement. In Auden's revised version, which was performed on stage, Sir Francis denounces the villagers and is killed.

The play is based in part on two earlier plays by Auden alone, "The Fronny", written in 1930, and mostly lost except for a few fragments printed in the edition of Auden's Plays listed below; and "The Chase", written in 1934, and also printed in the edition of Auden's Plays. Auden sent a copy of "The Chase" to Isherwood, who suggested revisions that eventually transformed the play into The Dog Beneath the Skin. In "The Fronny" the central character (who is referred to as "Fronny" in the surviving fragments) was apparently based loosely on the archaeologist Francis Turville-Petre, but the character of Sir Francis in The Chase and The Dog Beneath the Skin has no resemblance to Turville-Petre.
