= Spain (poem) =

1937 poem by W. H. Auden

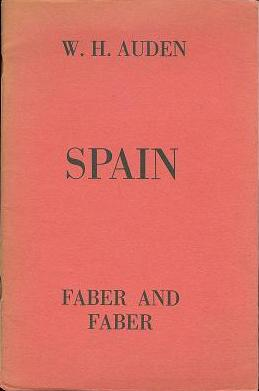
First edition.

Spain is a poem by W. H. Auden written after his visit to the Spanish Civil War. Spain was described by George Orwell as "one of the few decent things that have been written about the Spanish war". It was written and published in 1937. Auden donated all the profits from the sale of Spain to the Spanish Medical Aid Committee.

Auden published two versions of the poem, first as a pamphlet Spain (1937), then, in revised form and titled "Spain 1937", in his book Another Time (1940). He later rejected the poem from his collected editions, regarding it as a "dishonest" poem that expressed political views that he never believed but which he thought would be rhetorically effective.

The poem describes the history that led up to the Spanish Civil War, then the arrival of the International Brigades at the war itself, then foresees a possible future that may result from the war.

== Reception and influence ==
On its publication, Cyril Connolly described Spain as "good medium Auden in a good cause—the Spanish Medical Aid". Connolly criticized the poem's use of Marxist concepts, but ended his review of Spain by saying "the conclusion is very fine." The poem was widely discussed, notably by George Orwell in "Inside the Whale" (1940) and in E. P. Thompson's reply to Orwell, "Outside the Whale" (Out of Apathy, 1960). The scientist Joseph Needham, a great admirer of Auden, took the title of his 1943 book Time: The Refreshing River from Spain.
