= Kirchstetten =

- Municipality
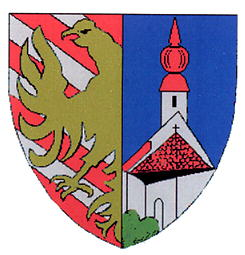
- Coat of arms

- Location within Austria
- Coordinates: 48°11′N 15°49′E
- Country: Austria
- State: Lower Austria
- District: Sankt Pölten-Land

Government
  - Mayor: Johann Dill

Area
  - Total: 17.76 km^{2} (6.86 sq mi)
- Elevation: 270 m (890 ft)

Population (2018-01-01)
  - Total: 2,189
  - Density: 123.3/km^{2} (319.2/sq mi)
- Time zone: UTC+1 (CET)
  - Summer (DST): UTC+2 (CEST)
- Postal code: 3062
- Area code: 02743
- Website: http://www.kirchstetten.at

Kirchstetten is a town in district of Sankt Pölten-Land in the Austrian state of Lower Austria.

== Population ==
Historical population
Year	Pop.	±%
1971	1,358	—
1981	1,451	+6.8%
1991	1,617	+11.4%
2001	1,814	+12.2%
2001	1,814	+0.0%
2019	2,183	+20.3%

== Personalities ==
It was the home during part of their lives to the Austrian poet Josef Weinheber and the English poet W. H. Auden. Auden is buried in a Kirchstetten churchyard and his home, at Hinterholz 6, houses a small writer's home museum to the poet in his loft study.
