= On the Frontier =

First edition (Faber & Faber)

On the Frontier: A Melodrama in Three Acts, by W. H. Auden and Christopher Isherwood, was the third and last play in the Auden–Isherwood collaboration, first published in 1938.

The play tells the story of the outbreak of war between the fictional European countries of Ostnia and Westland. Some of the action takes place in the "Ostnia–Westland Room", an imaginary setting in which two rooms, one in an Ostnian household, one in a Westland household, each occupy half the stage, and the family in one house are unaware of the family in the other—although the son and daughter of the two families sense each other's existence. Other scenes take place in the office of the Westland dictator. The play ends in a visionary scene between the two lovers who have never met in real life.

The play was produced in October 1938 at the Cambridge Arts Theatre, in a production by the Group Theatre (London). The incidental music for the play was composed by Benjamin Britten.
