= Elizabeth Mayer =

American translator and editor (1884–1970)

Elizabeth Wolff Mayer (1884 – 14 March 1970) was a German-born American translator and editor, closely associated with W. H. Auden, Benjamin Britten, Peter Pears, and other writers and musicians. After emigrating to the United States in the 1930s she used her homes in Long Island and New York City as salons for visiting artists.

== Biography ==
Elizabeth Mayer was born in Germany and spent her early life in Munich. Her father had been chaplain to the Grand Duke of Mecklenburg; she studied music and was a skilled pianist. She was married to the psychiatrist William Mayer, with whom she had two sons and two daughters. She worked as a translator in Germany, and visited D. H. Lawrence in Irschenhausen in 1927, where they discussed translation techniques. The Mayers moved to the United States in 1936 in order to flee Nazi persecution.

Her homes in Long Island and New York City were used as a salon for artists. Between 1939 and 1940, Benjamin Britten and Peter Pears stayed at her Long Island Home. Britten described her as "one of those grand people who have been essential through the ages for the production of art; really sympathetic and enthusiastic, with instinctive good taste". W. H. Auden wrote about "a house in Amityville, Long Island, the home of Dr. William and Elizabeth Mayer, where Benjamin Britten and Peter Pears stayed ... a house which played an important role in the lives of all three of us. It was during this period that Britten wrote his first opera, and I my first libretto".

Mayer died on March 14, 1970.

== Work ==
In collaboration with Marianne Moore she translated Adalbert Stifter's Bergkristall (Rock Crystal 1945). The Philadelphia Inquirer wrote that their translation "reflects the classic perfection of the original." Hannah Arendt also found the translation perfect.

In collaboration with Louise Bogan she translated Ernst Jünger's The Glass Bees (1961), Goethe's Elective Affinities (1963) and The Sorrows of Young Werther and Novella (both in 1 vol., 1971). One reviewer of Elective Affinities found the beginning "promising": by "tak[ing] liberties with the original text, ... [they] thereby win the modern reader's interest", but considered it "colorless, rather than timeless" overall. The New York Times reviewer wrote that the work on Elective Affinities was an "excellent translation—the only readable one I have come across", while The Washington Post reviewer wrote that their translation was his favorite.

With Auden she translated Goethe's Italian Journey (1962). Douglas Pringle wrote in The Sydney Morning Herald that this was a "very lively translation". She also translated Hans Graf von Lehndorff's Token of a Covenant: Diary of an East Prussian Surgeon, 1945–47 (1965).

With Peter Pears, Mayer prepared translations for Benjamin Britten, for inclusion in programs or scores of songs in Italian, German and Russian which he had set to music.

She was the dedicatee and recipient of Auden's poem New Year Letter and the book that included it, The Double Man (1941). In New Year Letter, Auden described her "learned peacefulness"; he regarded her the emotional equivalent of a mother, and was close to her for many years. Near the end of her life he wrote about her (without naming her) in his poem "Old People's Home", and in "Lines for Elizabeth Mayer", in About the House.

Mayer is the dedicatee of "Hymn To St. Cecilia", Op. 27, as well as the sixth section, titled "Interlude", of Britten's Les Illuminations, Op. 18, settings of Rimbaud for high voice and string orchestra.

She was a friend and admirer of Dorothy Day, co-founder of the Catholic Worker Movement.
