= The Dyer's Hand =

First edition (US)

The Dyer's Hand and Other Essays is a collection of essays and lectures by W. H. Auden, published in 1962 in the US by Random House and in the UK the following year by Faber & Faber.

== Overview ==
The book contains a selection of essays, reviews, and collections of aphorisms and notes written by Auden from the early 1950s to 1962. Many items were not previously published, but others appear in revised forms. Many of the essays are revised versions of Auden's lectures as Professor of Poetry at the University of Oxford from 1956 to 1961, including his inaugural lecture, "Making, Knowing and Judging".

== Dedicatee ==
The book is dedicated to Auden's tutor at Oxford, Nevill Coghill.

== Contents ==
1. Prologue

- "Reading"
- "Writing"

2. The Dyer's Hand

- "Making, Knowing and Judging"
- "The Virgin and the Dynamo"
- "The Poet and the City"

3. The Well of Narcissus

- "Hic et Ille"
- "Balaam and His Ass"
- "The Guilty Vicarage"
- "The I Without a Self"

4. The Shakespearian City

- "The Globe"
- "The Prince's Dog"
- "Interlude: The Wish Game"
- "Brothers & Others"
- "Interlude: West's Disease"
- "The Joker in the Pack"
- "Postscript: Infernal Science"

5. Two Bestiaries

- "D. H. Lawrence"
- "Marianne Moore"

6. Americana

- "The American Scene"
- "Postcript: Rome v. Monticello"
- "Red Ribbon on a White Horse"
- "Postscript: The Almighty Dollar"
- "Robert Frost"
- "American Poetry"
