= Horae Canonicae =

Sequence of poems by W. H. Auden

Horae Canonicae is a series of poems by W. H. Auden written between 1949 and 1955. The title is a reference to the canonical hours of the Christian Church, as are the titles of the seven poems constituting the series: "Prime", "Terce", "Sext", "Nones", "Vespers", "Compline", and "Lauds". Each refers to a fixed time of the day for prayer.

The canonical hours create a framework for the dramatization of Auden's religious position, which he described in a letter as "very much the same as Reinhold [Neibuhr]'s, i.e. Augustinian, not Thomist (I would allow a little more place, perhaps, for the Via Negativa.) Liturgically, I am Anglo-Catholic...".

"Prime" and "Nones" were first published in Auden's collection Nones (1951). Horae Canonicae was published as a unity in Auden's The Shield of Achilles (1955).

== See also ==
- Diurnal offices
