= City Without Walls =

1969 book by W. H. Auden

First edition (publ. Faber & Faber)

City Without Walls and other poems is a book by W. H. Auden, published in 1969.

The book contains Auden's shorter poems written from 1965 through 1968, together with his translations of the lyrics of Bertolt Brecht's Mother Courage and Her Children, and a few poems written earlier. Among the best-known poems in the book are the title poem, "The Horatians", "Amor Loci", "Forty Years On", "Partition", "August, 1968", "Fairground", "River Profile", "Ode to Terminus", and the autobiographical "Prologue at Sixty." A five-part section titled "Marginalia" is written mostly in haiku.

The book is dedicated to Peter Heyworth.
