= Journey to a War =

1939 book by W. H. Auden and Christopher Isherwood

First US edition (publ. Random House)

Journey to a War is a travel book in prose and verse by W. H. Auden and Christopher Isherwood, published in 1939.

The book is in three parts: a series of poems by Auden describing his and Isherwood's journey to China in 1938; a "Travel-Diary" by Isherwood (including material first drafted by Auden) about their travels in China itself, and their observations of the Sino-Japanese War; and "In Time of War: A Sonnet Sequence with a Verse Commentary" by Auden, with reflections on the contemporary world and their experiences in China. Some editions of the book also contain a selection of photographs by Auden.

Auden revised many of the poems in this book for his later collections; "In Time of War" was renamed "Sonnets from China" (with many original sonnets discarded) and the verse commentary was dropped entirely.
