= The Dance of Death (Auden play) =

1933 a one-act play in verse and prose by W. H. Auden

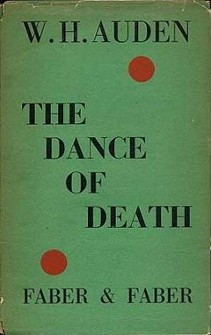
First edition (publ. Faber & Faber)

The Dance of Death is a one-act play in verse and prose by W. H. Auden, published in 1933.

The Dance of Death is a satiric musical extravaganza that portrays the "death inside" the middle classes as a silent dancer. The dancer first attempts to keep himself alive through escapism at a resort hotel, then through nationalistic enthusiasm, then through idealism, then through a New Year's party at a brothel, before he finally dies. Karl Marx appears on stage and pronounces the dancer dead. "The instruments of production have been too much for him."

The play was published by Faber & Faber in 1933, with a dedication to Robert Medley and Rupert Doone. It was performed by the Group Theatre (London), in 1934 and 1935. It was widely interpreted as pro-Communist, but Auden later wrote in a copy of the printed text, "The communists never spotted that this was a nihilistic leg-pull".
