= The Orators =

1932 long poem by W. H. Auden

First edition

The Orators: An English Study is a long poem in prose and verse written by W. H. Auden, first published in 1932. It is regarded as a major contribution to modernist poetry in English.

The Orators is divided into three main sections, framed by "Prologue" and "Epilogue" (each a short poem). Part I is "The Initiates" and comprises four speeches in dramatic prose. Part II is "Journal of an Airman", in prose with interpolated verses, in the form of a diary of an airman (or of someone who fantasizes himself to be an airman). Part III is "Six Odes", all in verse.

After the first edition in 1932, Auden slightly revised the book for a second edition in 1934. For a third edition in 1966 he added a brief foreword, omitted one of the Odes, and made minor cuts and changes throughout the book.
