= Alan Ansen =

American writer (1922–2006)

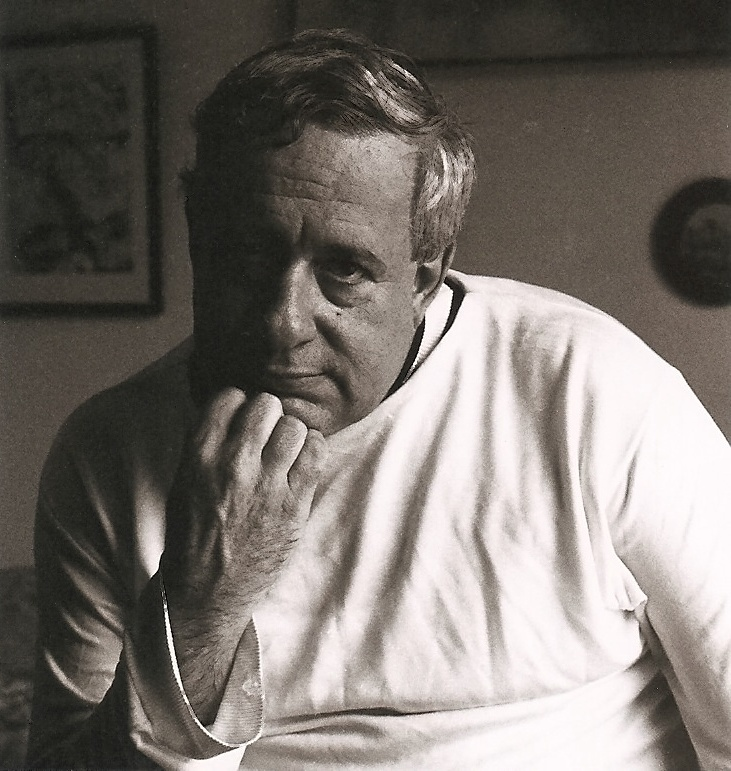
- Ansen in 1973
- Born: January 23, 1922
- Died: November 12, 2006 (aged 84); Athens, Greece
- Education: Harvard University
- Occupations: Poet, playwright
- Writing career
- Genres: American poetry, British poetry, American theater
- Notable work: The Table Talk of W. H. Auden

Alan Ansen (January 23, 1922 – November 12, 2006) was an American poet, playwright, and associate of Beat Generation writers. He was a widely read scholar who knew many languages. Ansen grew up on Long Island and was educated at Harvard. He worked as W. H. Auden's secretary and research assistant in 1948–49; he was the main author of the chronological tables in Auden's The Portable Greek Reader and Poets of the English Language.

== Relationship to Beat Writers ==
He became a close friend of various Beat writers, and was the model for "flamboyant" characters in their fiction (Ansen was gay), including Rollo Greb in Jack Kerouac's On the Road, AJ in William S. Burroughs' Naked Lunch, and Dad Deform in Gregory Corso's American Express. Ansen spent time in Tangiers with Paul Bowles and was a close associate of Allen Ginsberg. William Gaddis, who spent time in the early 50s on Long Island with Kerouac and Ansen, wrote that Ansen had never quite received the credit he deserved for being "the mentor he was for this whole [Beat] group," staying up with Jack until dawn drinking and talking.

Ansen was the protagonist in Ralph Rumney's psychogeographical guide to Venice, produced in 1957 and which primarily consisted of a number of photographs of Ansen – referred to as A. – taken by Rumney on a Rolleiflex camera.

Ansen lived mostly in Athens after the early 1960s, where he was part of a circle of writers that included James Merrill and Chester Kallman. Rachel Hadas, who also lived in Athens and met Ansen in 1969, described his life in "the tall old house on Alopekis Street":

Alan's apartment was notable for innumerable books and vases full of tall flowers—gladiolas, in particular.... There were two sofas in the flower- and book-filled living room, hard and covered with grubby tapestries, but very comfortable.... He had a sensible policy of not lending anything from his library, but the contents of many of his books, in any case, seemed to be in his head; he recited, declaimed and burst (in the case of opera) into song. Alan lived books, in a way that was rare even then.

== His works ==
- The Old Religion. Tibor de Nagy Gallery Editions, New York 1959; 300 copies. (poems)
- Disorderly Houses: A Book of Poems. Wesleyan University Series, Middletown, CT 1961. Wesleyan Poetry Series.
- William Burroughs: An Essay. Water Row Press, Sudbury 1986. (combines three previously published essays) A new edition, entitled A Burroughs Triptych and edited by Oliver Harris, was published by Water Row Books in 2022.
- The Vigilantes: A Fragment. Water Row Press, Sudbury 1987. (from an unpublished novel)
- Contact Highs: Selected Poems, 1957-1987. Dalkey Archive Press, Elmwood Park, IL 1989. Introduction by Steven Moore.
- The Table Talk of W.H. Auden. Sea Cliff Press, New York 1989. Ed. by Nicholas Jenkins, introduction by Richard Howard; excerpts from conversation diaries. (reprinted with two other publishers)

== Archival resources ==
- Alan Ansen collection of papers, 1942-1953 (72 items) are housed at the New York Public Library.
- Allen Ginsberg Papers, 1937-1994 (circa 1,000 linear feet) are housed at the Stanford University Department of Special Collections.
