= The Shield of Achilles =

1952 poem by W. H. Auden

First UK edition (publ. Faber & Faber)

The Shield of Achilles is a poem by W. H. Auden first published in 1952, and the title work of a collection of poems by Auden, published in 1955. It is Auden's response to the detailed description, or ekphrasis, of the shield borne by the hero Achilles in Homer's epic poem the Iliad.

== Description ==
Auden's poem is written in two different stanza forms, one form consisting of eight shorter lines, the other with seven longer lines written according to a rime royal rhyme scheme (ABABBCC). The stanzas with shorter lines describe the making of the shield by the god Hephaestus, and report the scenes that Achilles' mother, the Nereid Thetis, expects to find on the shield and which Hephaestus, in Auden's version, does not make. Thetis expects to find scenes of happiness and peace like those described by Homer.

The stanzas with longer lines describe the scenes of a barren and impersonal modern world that Hephaestus creates in Auden's version. In the first scene described by these stanzas, an anonymous, dispassionate army listens. In the second scene, a crowd of ordinary people watch passively as three "pale figures" are dragged towards and tied to posts. In the third scene, a "ragged urchin" throws a stone at a bird; he takes it for granted "that girls are raped, that two boys knife a third," and "has never heard of any world where promises are kept / Or one could weep because another wept." In the closing stanza, composed of short lines, Thetis cries out in dismay at what Hephaestus has made for her son, "who would not live long."

In these contrasting stanzas, Auden reflects on the differences between the vital, lyrical Achaean world described by Homer where, even amid warfare, imagination naturally ran to scenes of peace, and the violent, barren world, lacking any hope and meaning, that Auden himself imagines.

== Collection ==
The poem is the title work of The Shield of Achilles, a collection of poems in three parts, published in 1955, containing Auden's poems written from around 1951 through 1954. It begins with the sequence "Bucolics", then miscellaneous poems under the heading "In Sunshine and In Shade", then the sequence Horae Canonicae.

It won the U.S. National Book Award for Poetry in 1956.
