= Homage to Clio =

1960 book by W. H. Auden

First edition (US)

Homage to Clio is a book of poems by W. H. Auden, published in 1960.

The book contains Auden's shorter poems written between 1955 and 1959, including a group of poems on historical themes first published as a pamphlet titled The Old Man's Road (1956). The book contains three parts: a group of short poems, "Dichtung und Wahrheit: An Unwritten Poem" (in prose), and another group of short poems.

The short poems in the book include the title poem, "T the Great", "Makers of History", "You", "On Installing an American Kitchen in Lower Austria", "Tonight at seven thirty" and others.

The book is dedicated to A. E. and E. R. Dodds.
