= W. H. Auden =

British-American poet (1907–1973)

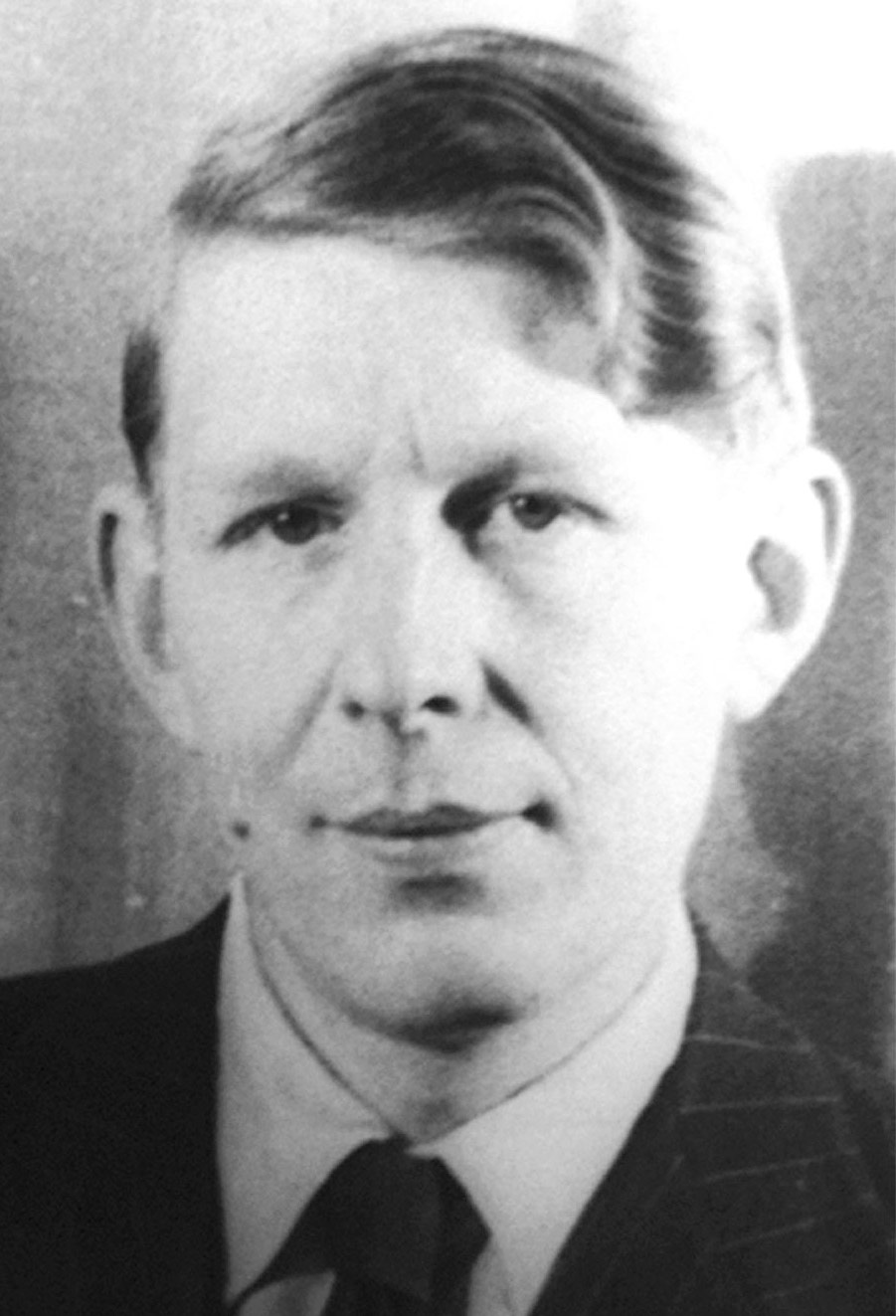
- Auden in 1939
- Born: Wystan Hugh Auden; 21 February 1907; York, England
- Died: 29 September 1973 (aged 66); Vienna, Austria
- Citizenship: United Kingdom; United States (from 1946)
- Education: Christ Church, Oxford (MA)
- Occupation: Poet
- Spouse: Erika Mann (m. 1935, of convenience)
- Relatives: George Augustus Auden (father); Constance Rosalie Bicknell Auden (mother); John Bicknell Auden (brother); George Bernard Auden (brother)
- Writing career
- Language: English

Wystan Hugh Auden (/ˈwɪstən ˈhjuː ˈɔːdən/ WIST-ən HYOO AWD-ən; 21 February 1907 – 29 September 1973) was a British-American poet. Auden's poetry is noted for its stylistic and technical achievement, its engagement with politics, morals, love, and religion, and its variety in tone, form, and content. Some of his best known poems are about love, such as "Funeral Blues"; on political and social themes, such as "September 1, 1939" and "The Shield of Achilles"; on cultural and psychological themes, such as The Age of Anxiety; and on religious themes, such as "For the Time Being" and "Horae Canonicae".

Auden was born in York and grew up in and near Birmingham in a professional, middle-class family. He attended various English independent (or public) schools and studied English at Christ Church, Oxford. After a few months in Berlin in 1928–29, he spent five years (1930–1935) teaching in British private preparatory schools. In 1939, he moved to the United States; he became an American citizen in 1946, retaining his British citizenship. Auden taught from 1941 to 1945 in American universities, followed by occasional visiting professorships in the 1950s.

Auden came to wide public attention in 1930 with his first book, Poems; it was followed in 1932 by The Orators. Three plays written in collaboration with Christopher Isherwood between 1935 and 1938 built his reputation as a left-wing political writer. Auden moved to the United States partly to escape this reputation, and his work in the 1940s, including the long poems "For the Time Being" and "The Sea and the Mirror", focused on religious themes. He won the Pulitzer Prize for Poetry for his 1947 long poem The Age of Anxiety, the title of which became a popular phrase describing the modern era. From 1956 to 1961, he was Professor of Poetry at Oxford; his lectures were popular with students and faculty and served as the basis for his 1962 prose collection The Dyer's Hand.

Auden was a prolific writer of prose essays and reviews on literary, political, psychological, and religious subjects, and he worked at various times on documentary films, poetic plays, and other forms of performance. Throughout his career he was both controversial and influential. Critical views on his work ranged from sharply dismissive (treating him as a lesser figure than W. B. Yeats and T. S. Eliot) to strongly affirmative (as in Joseph Brodsky's statement that he had "the greatest mind of the twentieth century"). After his death, his poems became known to a much wider public through films, broadcasts, and popular media.

== Life ==
=== Childhood ===
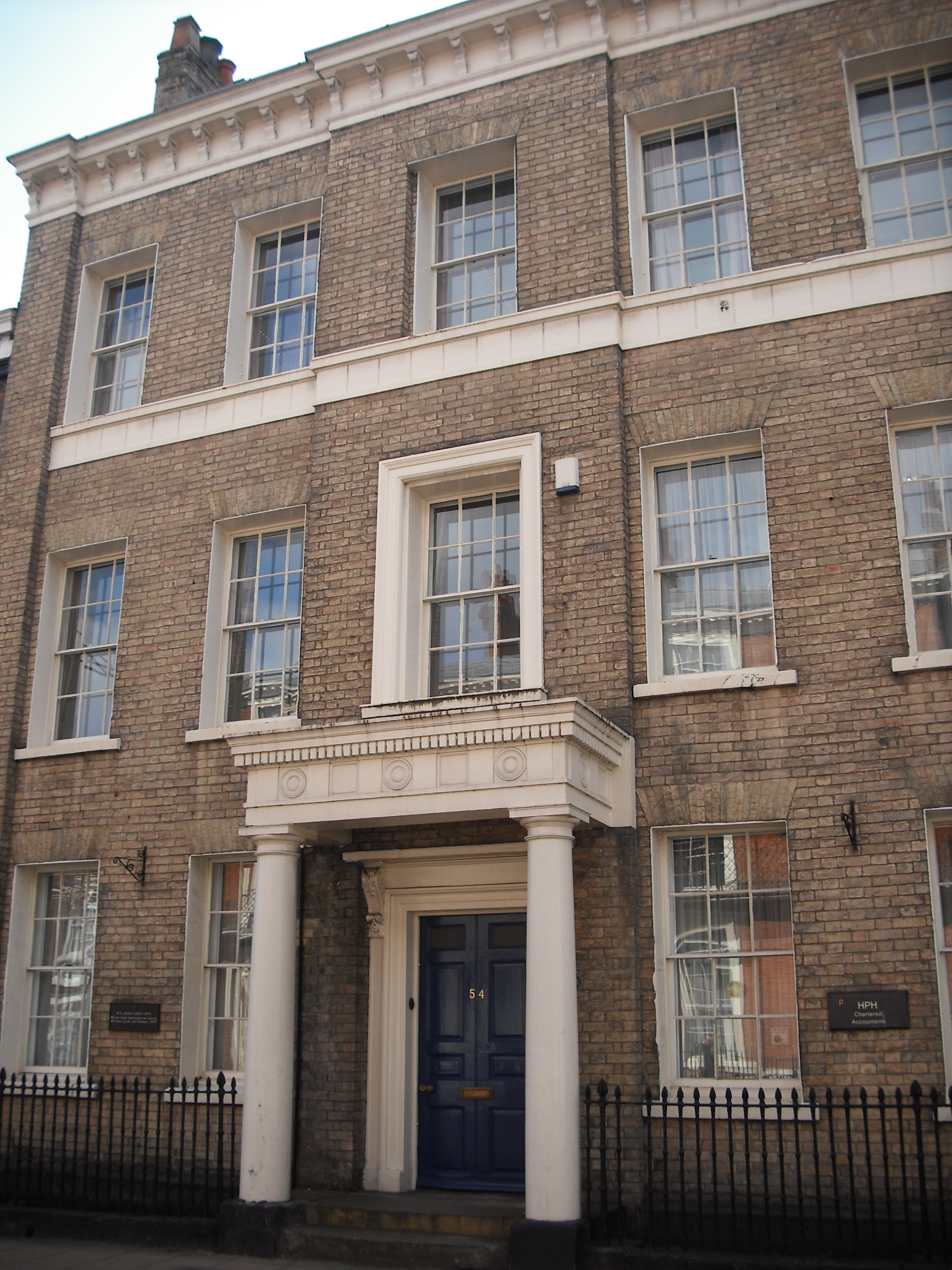
Auden's birthplace in York

Auden was born at 54 Bootham, York, England, to George Augustus Auden (1872–1957), a physician, and Constance Rosalie Auden (née Bicknell; 1869–1941), who had trained (but never served) as a missionary nurse. He was the third of three sons; the eldest, George Bernard Auden (1900–1978), became a farmer, while the second, John Bicknell Auden (1903–1991), became a geologist. The Audens were minor gentry with a strong clerical tradition, originally of Rowley Regis, later of Horninglow, Staffordshire.

Auden, whose grandfathers were both Church of England clergymen, grew up in an Anglo-Catholic household that followed a "high" form of Anglicanism, with doctrine and ritual resembling those of Catholicism. He traced his love of music and language partly to the church services of his childhood. He believed he was of Icelandic descent, and his lifelong fascination with Icelandic legends and Old Norse sagas is evident in his work.

His family moved to Homer Road in Solihull, near Birmingham, in 1908, where his father had been appointed the School Medical Officer and Lecturer (later Professor) of Public Health. Auden's lifelong psychoanalytic interests began in his father's library. From the age of eight he attended boarding schools, returning home for holidays. His visits to the Pennine landscape and its declining lead-mining industry figure in many of his poems; the remote decaying mining village of Rookhope was for him a "sacred landscape", evoked in a late poem, "Amor Loci". Until he was fifteen he expected to become a mining engineer, but his passion for words had already begun. He wrote later: "words so excite me that a pornographic story, for example, excites me sexually more than a living person can do."

=== Education ===
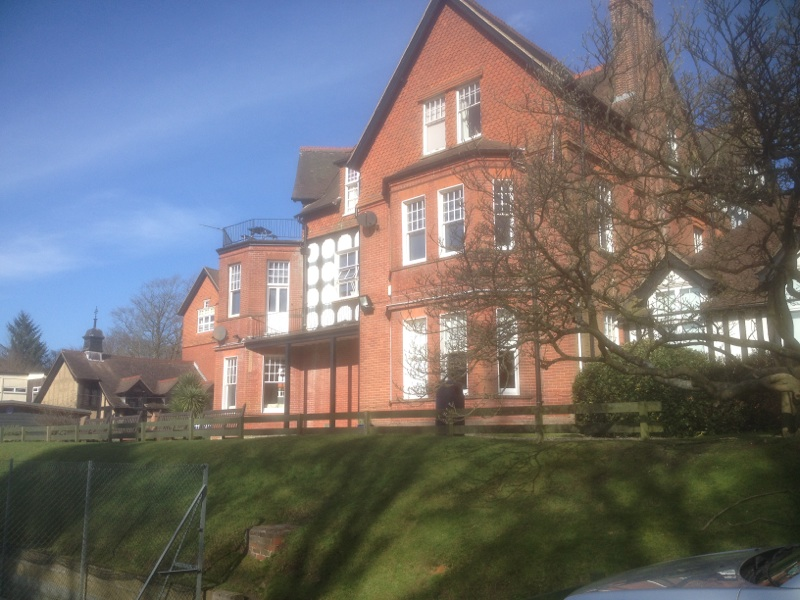
Auden's School at Hindhead in Surrey

Auden attended St Edmund's School, Hindhead, Surrey, where he met Christopher Isherwood, later famous in his own right as a novelist. At thirteen he went to Gresham's School in Holt, Norfolk; there, in 1922, when his friend Robert Medley asked him if he wrote poetry, Auden first realised his vocation was to be a poet. Soon after, he "discover(ed) that he (had) lost his faith" (through a gradual realisation that he had lost interest in religion, not through any decisive change of views). In school productions of Shakespeare, he played Katherina in The Taming of the Shrew in 1922, and Caliban in The Tempest in 1925, his last year at Gresham's. A review of his performance as Katherina noted that despite a poor wig, he had been able "to infuse considerable dignity into his passionate outbursts".

His first published poems appeared in the school magazine in 1923. Auden later wrote a chapter on Gresham's for Graham Greene's The Old School: Essays by Divers Hands (1934).

In 1925 he went up to Christ Church, Oxford, with a scholarship in biology; he changed to English by his second year, and was introduced to Old English poetry through the lectures of J. R. R. Tolkien. Friends he met at Oxford include Cecil Day-Lewis, Louis MacNeice, and Stephen Spender – Auden and these three were commonly though misleadingly identified in the 1930s as the "Auden Group" for their shared (but not identical) left-wing views. Auden left Oxford in 1928 with a third-class degree.

Auden was reintroduced to Christopher Isherwood in 1925 by his fellow student A. S. T. Fisher. For the next few years Auden sent poems to Isherwood for comments and criticism; the two maintained a sexual friendship in intervals between their relations with others. In 1935–39 they collaborated on three plays and a travel book.

From his Oxford years onward, Auden's friends uniformly described him as funny, extravagant, sympathetic, generous, and, partly by his own choice, lonely. In groups he was often dogmatic and overbearing in a comic way; in more private settings he was diffident and shy except when certain of his welcome. He was punctual in his habits, and obsessive about meeting deadlines, while living amidst physical disorder.

=== Britain and Europe, 1928–1938 ===
In late 1928, Auden left Britain for nine months, going to Berlin, perhaps partly as an escape from English repressiveness. In Berlin, he first experienced the political and economic unrest that became one of his central subjects. Around the same time, Stephen Spender privately printed a small pamphlet of Auden's Poems in an edition of about 45 copies, distributed among Auden's and Spender's friends and family; this edition is usually referred to as Poems [1928] to avoid confusion with Auden's commercially published 1930 volume.

On returning to Britain in 1929 he worked briefly as a tutor. In 1930 his first published book, Poems (1930), was accepted by T. S. Eliot for Faber & Faber, and the same firm remained the British publisher of all the books he published thereafter. In 1930, he began five years as a schoolmaster in boys' schools: two years at the Larchfield Academy in Helensburgh, Scotland, then three years at the Downs School in the Malvern Hills, where he was a much-loved teacher. At the Downs, in June 1933, he experienced what he later described as a "Vision of Agape", while sitting with three fellow teachers at the school, when he suddenly found that he loved them for themselves, that their existence had infinite value for him; this experience, he said, later influenced his decision to return to the Anglican Church in 1940.

During these years Auden's erotic interests focused, as he later said, on an idealised "Alter Ego" rather than on individual people. His relationships (and his unsuccessful courtships) tended to be unequal either in age or intelligence; his sexual relations were transient, although some evolved into long friendships. He contrasted these relationships with what he later regarded as the "marriage" (his word) of equals that he began with Chester Kallman in 1939, based on the unique individuality of both partners.

In 1935 Auden married Erika Mann (1905–1969), the bisexual novelist daughter of Thomas Mann, when it became apparent that the Nazis were intending to strip her of her German citizenship. Mann had asked Christopher Isherwood if he would marry her so she could become a British subject. He declined but suggested she approach Auden, who readily agreed to a marriage of convenience. Mann and Auden never lived together, but remained on good terms throughout their lives and were still married when Mann died in 1969. She left him a small bequest in her will. In 1936, Auden introduced actress Therese Giehse, Mann's lover, to the writer John Hampson, and they too married so that Giehse could leave Germany.

From 1935 until he left Britain early in 1939, Auden worked as freelance reviewer, essayist, and lecturer, first with the GPO Film Unit, a documentary film-making branch of the post office, headed by John Grierson. Through his work for the Film Unit in 1935 he met and collaborated with Benjamin Britten, with whom he also worked on plays, song cycles, and a libretto. Auden's plays in the 1930s were performed by the Group Theatre, in productions that he supervised to varying degrees.

His work now reflected his belief that any good artist must be "more than a bit of a reporting journalist". In 1936, Auden spent three months in Iceland where he gathered material for a travel book Letters from Iceland (1937), written in collaboration with Louis MacNeice. In 1937, he went to Spain intending to drive an ambulance for the Republic in the Spanish Civil War, but was put to work writing propaganda at the Republican press and propaganda office, where he felt useless and left after a week. He returned to England after a brief visit to the front at Sarineña. His seven-week visit to Spain affected him deeply, and his social views grew more complex as he found political realities to be more ambiguous and troubling than he had imagined. Again attempting to combine reportage and art, he and Isherwood spent six months in 1938 visiting China amid the Sino-Japanese War, working on their book Journey to a War (1939). On their way back to England they stayed briefly in New York and decided to move to the United States. Auden spent late 1938 partly in England, partly in Brussels.

Many of Auden's poems during the 1930s and after were inspired by unconsummated love, and in the 1950s he summarised his emotional life in a famous couplet: "If equal affection cannot be / Let the more loving one be me" ("The More Loving One"). He had a gift for friendship and, starting in the late 1930s, a strong wish for the stability of marriage; in a letter to his friend James Stern he called marriage "the only subject." Throughout his life, Auden performed charitable acts, sometimes in public, as in his 1935 marriage of convenience to Erika Mann, but, especially in later years, more often in private. He was embarrassed if they were publicly revealed, as when his gift to his friend Dorothy Day for the Catholic Worker movement was reported on the front page of The New York Times in 1956.

=== United States and Europe, 1939–1973 ===
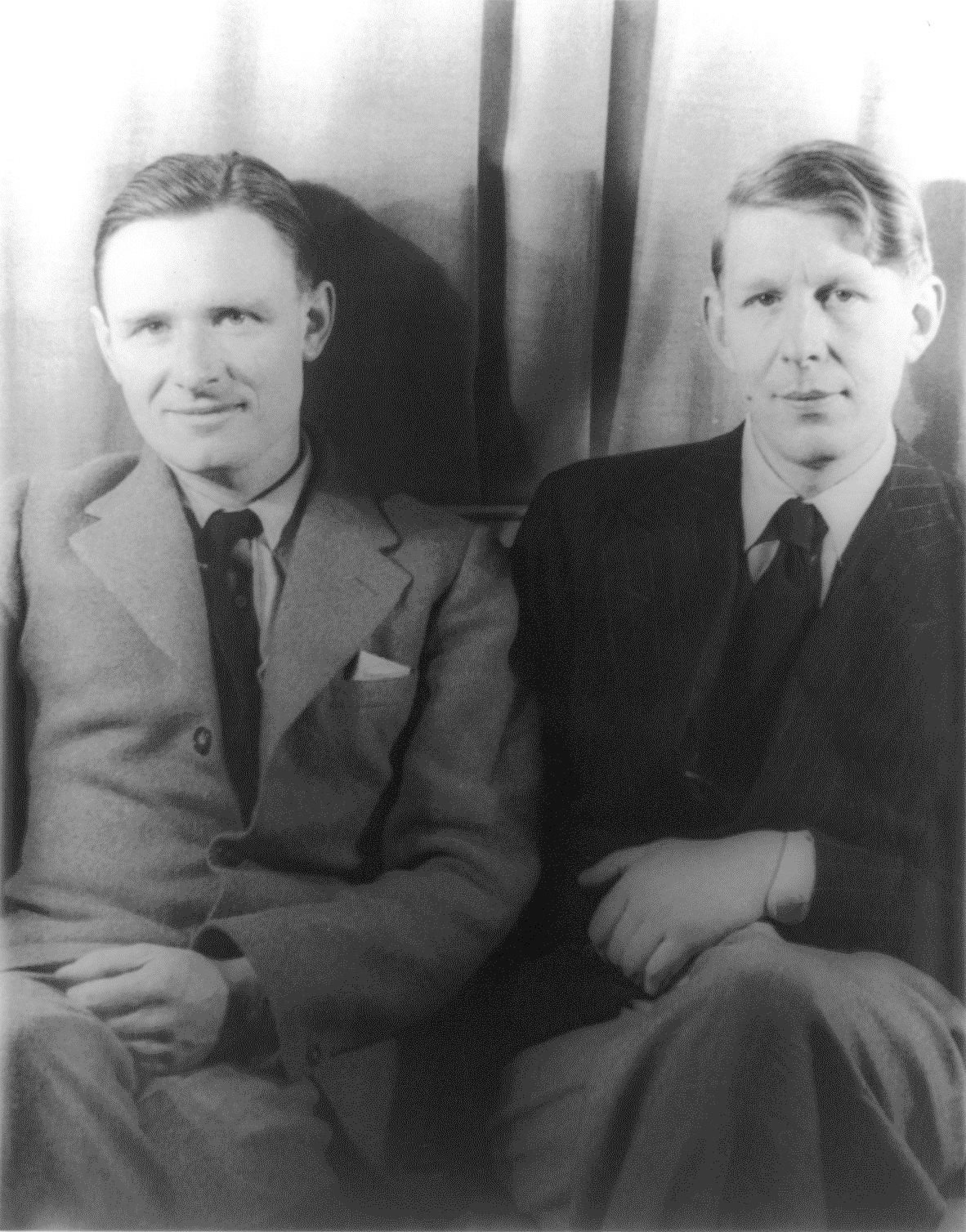
Christopher Isherwood (left) and W. H. Auden (right) photographed by Carl Van Vechten, 6 February 1939

Auden and Isherwood sailed to New York City in January 1939, entering on temporary visas. Their departure from Britain was later seen by many as a betrayal, and Auden's reputation suffered. In April 1939, Isherwood moved to California, and he and Auden saw each other only intermittently in later years. Around this time, Auden met the poet Chester Kallman, who became his lover for the next two years (Auden described their relation as a "marriage" that began with a cross-country "honeymoon" journey).

In 1941 Kallman ended their sexual relationship because he could not accept Auden's insistence on mutual fidelity, but he and Auden remained companions for the rest of Auden's life, sharing houses and apartments from 1953 until Auden's death. Auden dedicated both editions of his collected poetry (1945/50 and 1966) to Isherwood and Kallman.

In 1940–41 Auden lived in a house at 7 Middagh Street in Brooklyn Heights, that he shared with Carson McCullers, Benjamin Britten, and others, which became a famous centre of artistic life, nicknamed "February House". In 1940, Auden joined the Episcopal Church, returning to the Anglican Communion he had abandoned at fifteen. His reconversion was influenced partly by what he called the "sainthood" of Charles Williams, whom he had met in 1937, and partly by reading Søren Kierkegaard and Reinhold Niebuhr; his existential, this-worldly Christianity became a central element in his life.

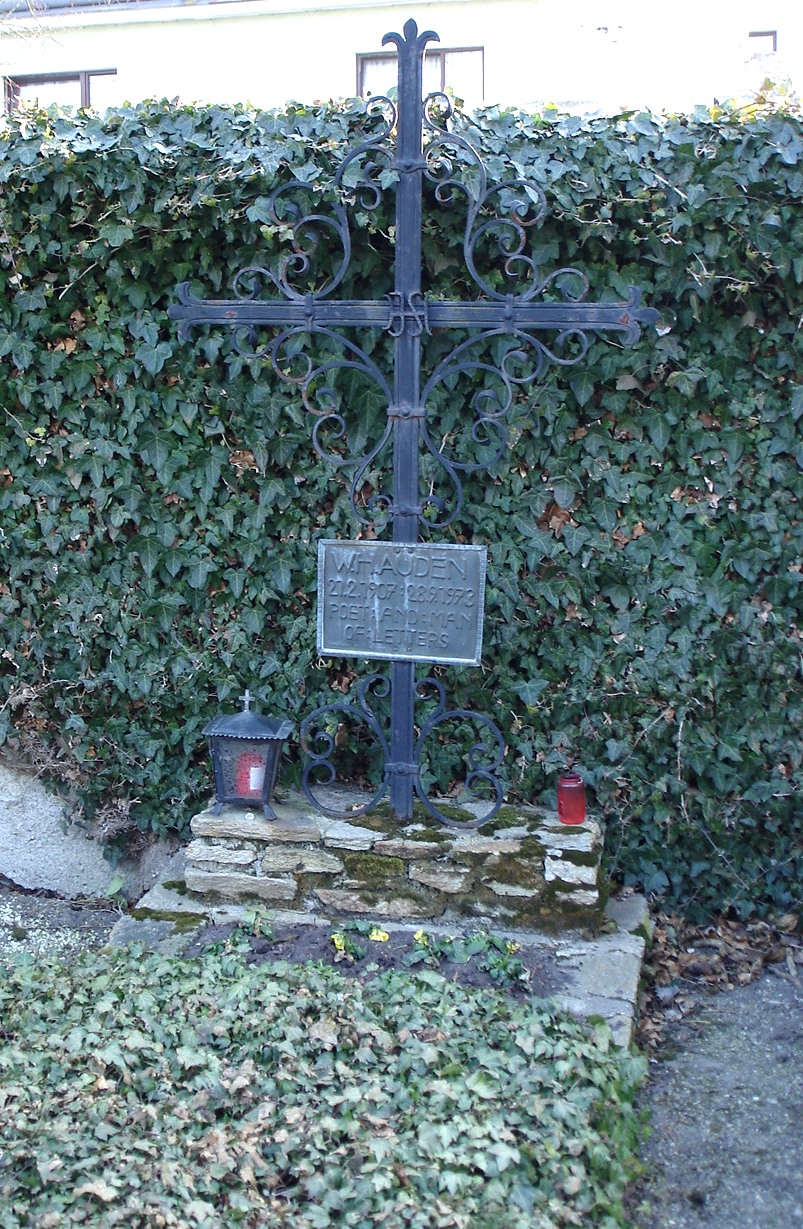
Auden's grave at Kirchstetten (Lower Austria)

After Britain declared war on Germany in September 1939, Auden told the British embassy in Washington that he would return to the UK if needed. He was told that, among those his age (32), only qualified personnel were needed. In 1941–42 he taught English at the University of Michigan. He was called for the draft in the United States Army in August 1942, but was rejected on medical grounds. He had been awarded a Guggenheim Fellowship for 1942–43 but did not use it, choosing instead to teach at Swarthmore College in 1942–45.

In mid-1945, after the end of World War II in Europe, he was in Germany with the US Strategic Bombing Survey, studying the effects of Allied bombing on German morale, an experience that affected his postwar work as his visit to Spain had affected him earlier. On his return, he settled in Manhattan, working as a freelance writer, a lecturer at The New School for Social Research, and a visiting professor at Bennington, Smith, and other American colleges. In 1946, he became a naturalised citizen of the US.

In 1948 Auden began spending his summers in Europe, together with Chester Kallman, first in Ischia, Italy, where he rented a house. Starting in 1958 he began spending his summers in Kirchstetten, Austria, where he bought a farmhouse with the prize money of the Premio Feltrinelli awarded to him in 1957. He said that he shed tears of joy at owning a home for the first time. His later poetry, mostly written in Austria, includes his sequence "Thanksgiving for a Habitat" about his Kirchstetten home. Auden's letters and papers sent to his friend the translator Stella Musulin (1915–1996), available online, provide insights into his Austrian years. Auden's correspondence to his Vienna-based lover and friend Hugo Kurka were discovered only in 2023.

In 1956–61 Auden was Professor of Poetry at Oxford University, where he was required to give three lectures each year. This fairly light workload allowed him to continue to spend winter in New York, where he lived at 77 St. Mark's Place in Manhattan's East Village, and to spend summer in Europe, spending only three weeks each year lecturing in Oxford. He earned his income mostly from readings and lecture tours, and by writing for The New Yorker, The New York Review of Books, and other magazines.

In 1963 Kallman left the apartment he shared in New York with Auden, and lived during the winter in Athens while continuing to spend his summers with Auden in Austria. Auden spent the winter of 1964–1965 in Berlin through an artist-in-residence program of the Ford Foundation.

Following some years of lobbying by his friend David Luke, Auden's old college, Christ Church, in February 1972 offered him a cottage on its grounds to live in; he moved his books and other possessions from New York to Oxford in September 1972, while continuing to spend summers in Austria with Kallman. He spent only one winter in Oxford before his death in 1973.

Auden died at 66 of heart failure at the Altenburgerhof Hotel in Vienna overnight on 28–29 September 1973, a few hours after giving a reading of his poems for the Austrian Society for Literature at the Palais Pálffy. He had intended to return to Oxford the following day. He was buried on 4 October in Kirchstetten, and a memorial stone was placed in Westminster Abbey in London a year later.

== Work ==
Auden published about four hundred poems, including seven long poems (two of them book-length). His poetry was encyclopaedic in scope and method, ranging in style from obscure twentieth-century modernism to the lucid traditional forms such as ballads and limericks, from doggerel through haiku and villanelles to a "Christmas Oratorio" and a baroque eclogue in Anglo-Saxon meters. The tone and content of his poems ranged from pop-song clichés to complex philosophical meditations, from the corns on his toes to atoms and stars, from contemporary crises to the evolution of society.

He also wrote more than four hundred essays and reviews about literature, history, politics, music, religion, and many other subjects. He collaborated on plays with Christopher Isherwood and on opera libretti with Chester Kallman, and worked with a group of artists and filmmakers on documentary films in the 1930s and with the New York Pro Musica early music group in the 1950s and 1960s. About collaboration he wrote in 1964: "collaboration has brought me greater erotic joy . . . than any sexual relations I have had."

Auden controversially rewrote or discarded some of his most famous poems when he prepared his later collected editions. He wrote that he rejected poems that he found "boring" or "dishonest" in the sense that they expressed views he had never held but had used only because he felt they would be rhetorically effective. His rejected poems include "Spain" and "September 1, 1939". His literary executor, Edward Mendelson, argues in his introduction to Selected Poems that Auden's practice reflected his sense of the persuasive power of poetry and his reluctance to misuse it. (Selected Poems includes some poems that Auden rejected and early texts of poems that he revised.)

=== Early work, 1922–1939 ===
==== Up to 1930 ====
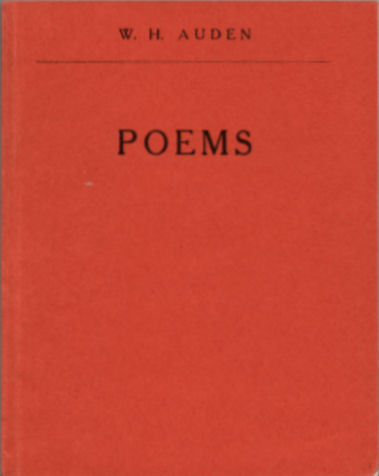
Cover of the privately printed Poems (1928)

Auden began writing poems in 1922, at 15, mostly in the styles of 19th-century romantic poets, especially Wordsworth, and later poets with rural interests, especially Thomas Hardy. At 18 he discovered T. S. Eliot and adopted an extreme version of Eliot's style. He found his own voice at 20 when he wrote the first poem later included in his collected work, "From the very first coming down". This and other poems of the late 1920s tended to be in a clipped, elusive style that alluded to, but did not directly state, their themes of loneliness and loss. Twenty of these poems appeared in his first book Poems (1928), a pamphlet hand-printed by Stephen Spender.

In 1928 he wrote his first dramatic work, Paid on Both Sides, subtitled "A Charade", which combined style and content from the Icelandic sagas with jokes from English school life. This mixture of tragedy and farce, with a dream play-within-a-play, introduced the mixed styles and content of much of his later work. This drama and thirty short poems appeared in his first published book Poems (1930, 2nd edition with seven poems replaced, 1933); the poems in the book were mostly lyrical and gnomic meditations on hoped-for or unconsummated love and on themes of personal, social, and seasonal renewal; among these poems were "It was Easter as I walked", "Doom is dark", "Sir, no man's enemy", and "This lunar beauty".

A recurrent theme in these early poems is the effect of "family ghosts", Auden's term for the powerful, unseen psychological effects of preceding generations on any individual life (and the title of a poem). A parallel theme, present throughout his work, is the contrast between biological evolution (unchosen and involuntary) and the psychological evolution of cultures and individuals (voluntary and deliberate even in its subconscious aspects).

==== 1931–1935 ====
Programme of a Group Theatre production of The Dance of Death, with unsigned synopsis by Auden

Auden's next large-scale work was The Orators: An English Study (1932; revised editions, 1934, 1966), in verse and prose, largely about hero-worship in personal and political life. In his shorter poems, his style became more open and accessible, and the exuberant "Six Odes" in The Orators reflect his new interest in Robert Burns. During the next few years, many of his poems took their form and style from traditional ballads and popular songs, and also from expansive classical forms like the Odes of Horace, which he seems to have discovered through the German poet Hölderlin. Around this time his main influences were Dante, William Langland, and Alexander Pope.

During these years much of his work expressed left-wing views, and he became widely known as a political poet although he was privately more ambivalent about revolutionary politics than many reviewers recognised, and Mendelson argues that he expounded political views partly out of a sense of moral duty and partly because it enhanced his reputation, and that he later regretted having done so. He generally wrote about revolutionary change in terms of a "change of heart", a transformation of a society from a closed-off psychology of fear to an open psychology of love.

His verse drama The Dance of Death (1933) was a political extravaganza in the style of a theatrical revue, which Auden later called "a nihilistic leg-pull." His next play The Dog Beneath the Skin (1935), written in collaboration with Isherwood, was similarly a quasi-Marxist updating of Gilbert and Sullivan in which the general idea of social transformation was more prominent than any specific political action or structure.

The Ascent of F6 (1937), another play written with Isherwood, was partly an anti-imperialist satire, partly (in the character of the self-destroying climber Michael Ransom) an examination of Auden's own motives in taking on a public role as a political poet. This play included the first version of "Funeral Blues" ("Stop all the clocks"), written as a satiric eulogy for a politician; Auden later rewrote the poem as a "Cabaret Song" about lost love (written to be sung by the soprano Hedli Anderson, for whom he wrote many lyrics in the 1930s). In 1935, he worked briefly on documentary films with the GPO Film Unit, writing his famous verse commentary for Night Mail and lyrics for other films that were among his attempts in the 1930s to create a widely accessible, socially conscious art.

==== 1936–1939 ====
In 1936 Auden's publisher chose the title Look, Stranger! for a collection of political odes, love poems, comic songs, meditative lyrics, and a variety of intellectually intense but emotionally accessible verse; Auden hated the title and retitled the collection for the 1937 US edition On This Island. Among the poems included in the book are "Hearing of harvests", "Out on the lawn I lie in bed", "O what is that sound", "Look, stranger, on this island now" (later revised versions change on to at), and "Our hunting fathers".

Auden was now arguing that an artist should be a kind of journalist, and he put this view into practice in Letters from Iceland (1937) a travel book in prose and verse written with Louis MacNeice, which included his long social, literary, and autobiographical commentary "Letter to Lord Byron". In 1937, after observing the Spanish Civil War he wrote a politically engaged pamphlet poem Spain (1937); he later discarded it from his collected works. Journey to a War (1939) a travel book in prose and verse, was written with Isherwood after their visit to the Sino-Japanese War. Auden's last collaboration with Isherwood was their third play, On the Frontier, an anti-war satire written in Broadway and West End styles.

Auden's shorter poems now engaged with the fragility and transience of personal love ("Danse Macabre", "The Dream", "Lay your sleeping head"), a subject he treated with ironic wit in his "Four Cabaret Songs for Miss Hedli Anderson" (which included "Tell Me the Truth About Love" and the revised version of "Funeral Blues"), and also the corrupting effect of public and official culture on individual lives ("Casino", "School Children", "Dover"). In 1938, he wrote a series of dark, ironic ballads about individual failure ("Miss Gee", "James Honeyman", "Victor"). All these appeared in Another Time (1940), together with poems including "Dover", "As He Is", and "Musée des Beaux Arts" (all of which were written before he moved to America in 1939), and "In Memory of W. B. Yeats", "The Unknown Citizen", "Law Like Love", "September 1, 1939", and "In Memory of Sigmund Freud" (all written in America).

The elegies for Yeats and Freud are partly anti-heroic statements, in which great deeds are performed, not by unique geniuses whom others cannot hope to imitate, but by otherwise ordinary individuals who were "silly like us" (Yeats) or of whom it could be said "he wasn't clever at all" (Freud), and who became teachers of others, not awe-inspiring heroes.

=== Middle period, 1940–1957 ===
==== 1940–1946 ====
In 1940 Auden wrote a long philosophical poem "New Year Letter", which appeared with miscellaneous notes and other poems in The Double Man (1941). At the time of his return to the Anglican Communion he began writing abstract verse on theological themes, such as "Canzone" and "Kairos and Logos". Around 1942, as he became more comfortable with religious themes, his verse became more open and relaxed, and he increasingly used the syllabic verse he had learned from the poetry of Marianne Moore.

Auden's work in this era addresses the artist's temptation to use other persons as material for his art rather than valuing them for themselves ("Prospero to Ariel") and the corresponding moral obligation to make and keep commitments while recognising the temptation to break them ("In Sickness and Health"). From 1942 through 1947 he worked mostly on three long poems in dramatic form, each differing from the others in form and content: "For the Time Being: A Christmas Oratorio", "The Sea and the Mirror: A Commentary on Shakespeare's The Tempest" (both published in For the Time Being, 1944), and The Age of Anxiety: A Baroque Eclogue (published separately in 1947). The first two, with Auden's other new poems from 1940 to 1944, were included in his first collected edition, The Collected Poetry of W. H. Auden (1945), with most of his earlier poems, many in revised versions.

==== 1947–1957 ====
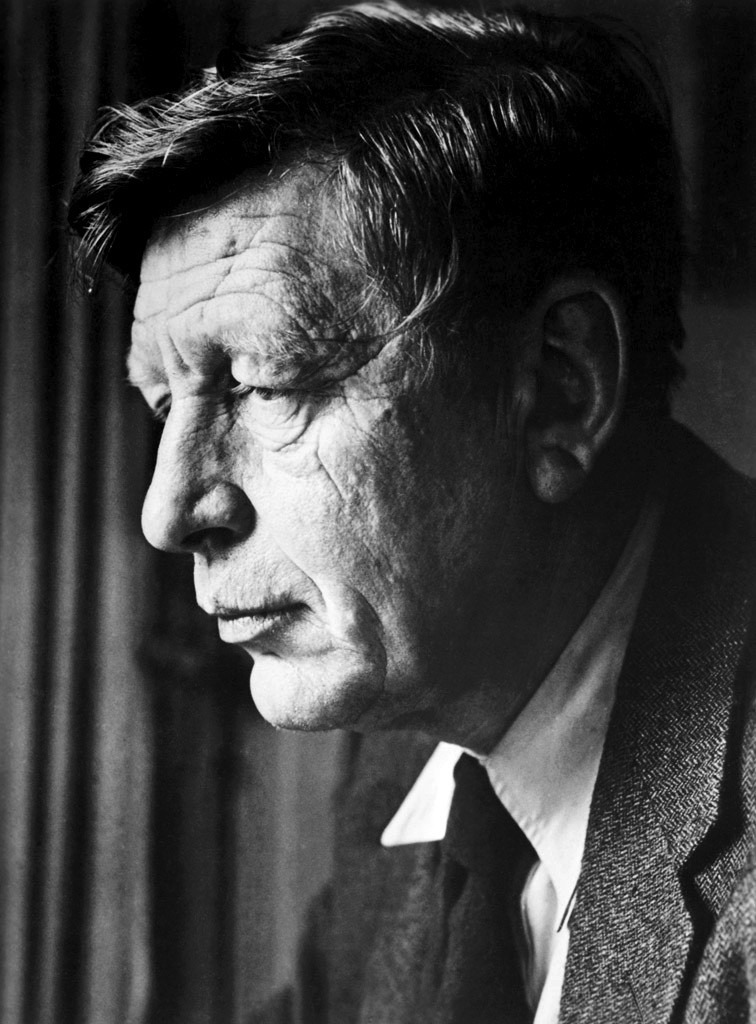
Auden in 1956

After completing The Age of Anxiety in 1946 he focused again on shorter poems, notably "A Walk After Dark", "The Love Feast", and "The Fall of Rome". Many of these evoked the Italian village where he spent his summers between 1948 and 1957, and his next book, Nones (1951), had a Mediterranean atmosphere new to his work. A new theme was the "sacred importance" of the human body in its ordinary aspect (breathing, sleeping, eating) and the continuity with nature that the body made possible (in contrast to the division between humanity and nature that he had emphasised in the 1930s); his poems on these themes included "In Praise of Limestone" (1948) and "Memorial for the City" (1949). In 1947–1948, Auden and Kallman wrote the libretto for Igor Stravinsky's opera The Rake's Progress, and later collaborated on two libretti for operas by Hans Werner Henze.

Auden's first separate prose book was The Enchafèd Flood: The Romantic Iconography of the Sea (1950), based on a series of lectures on the image of the sea in romantic literature. Between 1949 and 1954 he worked on a sequence of seven Good Friday poems, titled "Horae Canonicae", an encyclopaedic survey of geological, biological, cultural, and personal history, focused on the irreversible act of murder; the poem was also a study in cyclical and linear ideas of time. While writing this, he also wrote "Bucolics", a sequence of seven poems about man's relation to nature. Both sequences appeared in his next book, The Shield of Achilles (1955), with other short poems, including the book's title poem, "Fleet Visit", and "Epitaph for the Unknown Soldier".

In 1955–56 Auden wrote a group of poems about "history", the term he used to mean the set of unique events made by human choices, as opposed to "nature", the set of involuntary events created by natural processes, statistics, and anonymous forces such as crowds. These poems included "T the Great", "The Maker", and the title poem of his next collection Homage to Clio (1960).

=== Later work, 1958–1973 ===
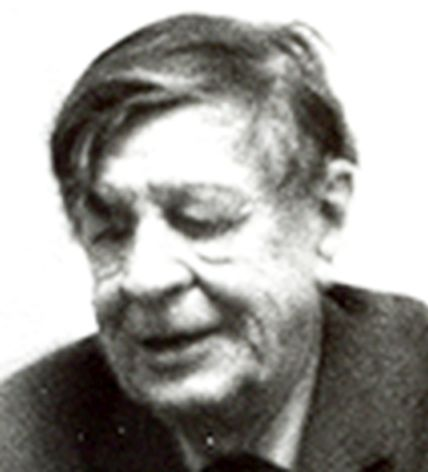
Auden in 1970

In the late 1950s Auden's style became less rhetorical while its range of styles increased. In 1958, having moved his summer home from Italy to Austria, he wrote "Good-bye to the Mezzogiorno"; other poems from this period include "Dichtung und Wahrheit: An Unwritten Poem", a prose poem about the relation between love and personal and poetic language, and the contrasting "Dame Kind", about the anonymous impersonal reproductive instinct. These and other poems, including his 1955–66 poems about history, appeared in Homage to Clio (1960). His prose book The Dyer's Hand (1962) gathered many of the lectures he gave in Oxford as Professor of Poetry in 1956–61, together with revised versions of essays and notes written since the mid-1940s.

Among the new styles and forms in Auden's later work were the haiku and tanka that he began writing after translating the haiku and other verse in Dag Hammarskjöld's Markings. A sequence of fifteen poems about his house in Austria, "Thanksgiving for a Habitat" (written in various styles that included an imitation of William Carlos Williams) appeared in About the House (1965), together with other poems that included his reflection on his lecture tours, "On the Circuit". In the late 1960s he wrote some of his most vigorous poems, including "River Profile" and two poems that looked back over his life, "Prologue at Sixty" and "Forty Years On". All these appeared in City Without Walls (1969). His lifelong passion for Icelandic legend culminated in his verse translation of The Elder Edda (1969). Among his later themes was the "religionless Christianity" he learned partly from Dietrich Bonhoeffer, the dedicatee of his poem "Friday's Child".

A Certain World: A Commonplace Book (1970) was a kind of self-portrait made up of favourite quotations with commentary, arranged in alphabetical order by subject. His last prose book was a selection of essays and reviews, Forewords and Afterwords (1973). His last books of verse, Epistle to a Godson (1972) and the unfinished Thank You, Fog (published posthumously, 1974) include reflective poems about language ("Natural Linguistics", "Aubade"), philosophy and science ("No, Plato, No", "Unpredictable but Providential"), and his own aging ("A New Year Greeting", "Talking to Myself"—which he dedicated to his friend Oliver Sacks, "A Lullaby" ["The din of work is subdued"]). His last completed poem was "Archaeology", about ritual and timelessness, two recurring themes in his later years.

=== Reputation and influence ===
Auden's stature in modern literature has been contested. Probably the most common critical view from the 1930s onward ranked him as the last and least of the three major twentieth-century poets of the UK or Ireland—behind Yeats and Eliot—while a minority view, more prominent in recent years, ranks him as the highest of the three. Opinions have ranged from those of Hugh MacDiarmid, who called him "a complete wash-out"; F. R. Leavis, who wrote that Auden's ironic style was "self-defensive, self-indulgent or merely irresponsible"; and Harold Bloom, who wrote "Close thy Auden, open thy [Wallace] Stevens," to the obituarist in The Times, who wrote: "W.H. Auden, for long the enfant terrible of English poetry... emerges as its undisputed master." Joseph Brodsky wrote that Auden had "the greatest mind of the twentieth century".

Critical estimates were divided from the start. Reviewing Auden's first book, Poems (1930), Naomi Mitchison wrote, "If this is really only the beginning, we have perhaps a master to look forward to." But John Sparrow, recalling Mitchison's comment in 1934, dismissed Auden's early work as "a monument to the misguided aims that prevail among contemporary poets, and the fact that... he is being hailed as 'a master' shows how criticism is helping poetry on the downward path."

Auden's clipped, satiric, and ironic style in the 1930s was widely imitated by younger poets such as Charles Madge, who wrote in a poem "there waited for me in the summer morning / Auden fiercely. I read, shuddered, and knew." He was widely described as the leader of an "Auden group" that comprised his friends Stephen Spender, Cecil Day-Lewis, and Louis MacNeice. The four were mocked by the poet Roy Campbell as if they were a single undifferentiated poet named "Macspaunday". Auden's propagandistic poetic plays, including The Dog Beneath the Skin and The Ascent of F6, and his political poems such as "Spain" gave him the reputation as a political poet writing in a progressive and accessible voice, in contrast to Eliot; but this political stance provoked opposing opinions, such as that of Austin Clarke who called Auden's work "liberal, democratic, and humane", and John Drummond, who wrote that Auden misused a "characteristic and popularizing trick, the generalized image", to present ostensibly left-wing views that were in fact "confined to bourgeois experience."

Auden's departure for America in 1939 was debated in Britain (once even in Parliament), with some seeing his emigration as a betrayal. Defenders of Auden such as Geoffrey Grigson, in an introduction to a 1949 anthology of modern poetry, wrote that Auden "arches over all". His stature was suggested by book titles such as Auden and After by Francis Scarfe (1942) and The Auden Generation by Samuel Hynes (1977).

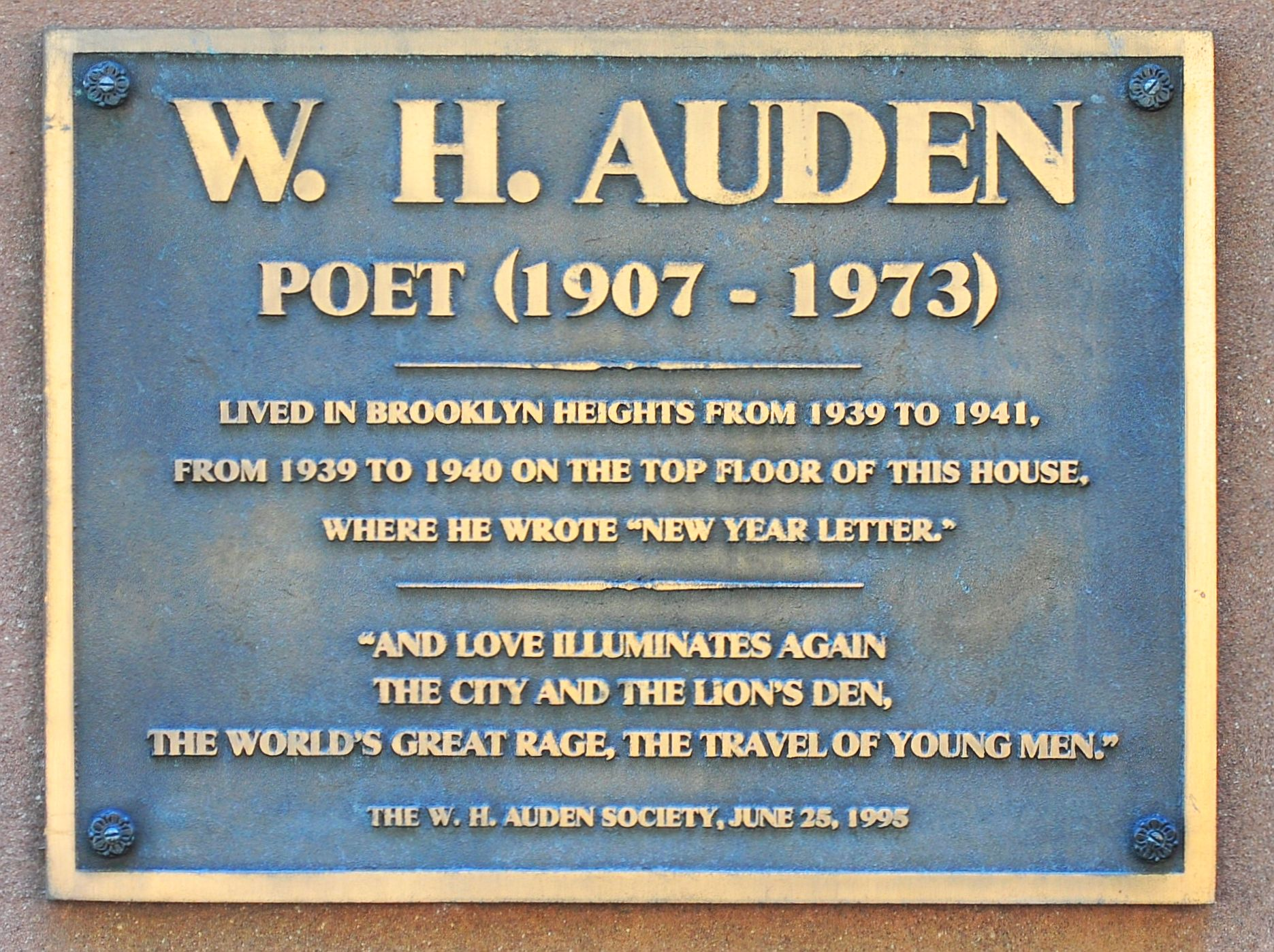
Commemorative plaque at one of Auden's homes in Brooklyn Heights, New York

In the US, starting in the late 1930s, the detached, ironic tone of Auden's regular stanzas became influential; John Ashbery recalled that in the 1940s Auden "was the modern poet". Auden's formal influences were so pervasive in American poetry that the ecstatic style of the Beat Generation was partly a reaction against his influence. From the 1940s through the 1960s, many critics lamented that Auden's work had declined from its earlier promise; Randall Jarrell wrote a series of essays making a case against Auden's later work, and Philip Larkin's "What's Become of Wystan?" (1960) had a wide impact.

The first full-length study of Auden was Richard Hoggart's Auden: An Introductory Essay (1951), which concluded that "Auden's work, then, is a civilising force." It was followed by Joseph Warren Beach's The Making of the Auden Canon (1957), a disapproving account of Auden's revisions of his earlier work. The first systematic critical account was Monroe K. Spears' The Poetry of W. H. Auden: The Disenchanted Island (1963), "written out of the conviction that Auden's poetry can offer the reader entertainment, instruction, intellectual excitement, and a prodigal variety of aesthetic pleasures, all in a generous abundance that is unique in our time."

Auden was one of three candidates recommended by the Nobel Committee to the Swedish Academy for the Nobel Prize in Literature in 1963 and 1965 and six recommended for the 1964 prize. By the time of his death in 1973 he had attained the status of a respected elder statesman, and a memorial stone for him was placed in Poets' Corner in Westminster Abbey in 1974. The Encyclopædia Britannica writes that "by the time of Eliot's death in 1965... a convincing case could be made for the assertion that Auden was indeed Eliot's successor, as Eliot had inherited sole claim to supremacy when Yeats died in 1939." With some exceptions, British critics tended to treat his early work as his best, while American critics tended to favour his middle and later work.

Another group of critics and poets has maintained that unlike other modern poets, Auden's reputation did not decline after his death, and the influence of his later writing was especially strong on younger American poets including John Ashbery, James Merrill, Anthony Hecht, and Maxine Kumin. Typical later evaluations describe him as "arguably the [20th] century's greatest poet" (Peter Parker and Frank Kermode), who "now clearly seems the greatest poet in English since Tennyson" (Philip Hensher).

Auden became a close friend of neurologist Oliver Sacks and after publication of Sacks's first book Migraine, in 1970, his review encouraged Sacks to adapt his writing style to "be metaphorical, be mythical, be whatever you need."

Public recognition of Auden's work sharply increased after his "Funeral Blues" ("Stop all the clocks") was read aloud in the film Four Weddings and a Funeral (1994); subsequently, a pamphlet edition of ten of his poems, Tell Me the Truth About Love, sold more than 275,000 copies. An excerpt from his poem "As I walked out one evening" was recited in the film Before Sunrise (1995). After the 11 September 2001 attacks, his 1939 poem "September 1, 1939" was widely circulated and frequently broadcast. Public readings and broadcast tributes in the UK and US in 2007 marked his centenary year.

Overall Auden's poetry was noted for its stylistic and technical achievement, its engagement with politics, morals, love, and religion, and its variety in tone, form and content.

Memorial stones and plaques commemorating Auden include those in Westminster Abbey; at his birthplace at 55 Bootham, York; near his home on Lordswood Road, Birmingham; in the chapel of Christ Church, Oxford; on the site of his apartment at 1 Montague Terrace, Brooklyn Heights; at his apartment in 77 St. Marks Place, New York (damaged and now removed); at the site of his death at Walfischgasse 5 in Vienna; and in the Rainbow Honor Walk in San Francisco. In his house in Kirchstetten, his study is open to the public upon request.

In 2023, newly declassified UK government files revealed that Auden was considered as a candidate to be the new Poet Laureate of the United Kingdom in 1967 following the death of John Masefield. He was rejected due to having taken American citizenship.

== Published works ==
The following list includes only the books of poems and essays that Auden prepared during his lifetime; for a more complete list, including other works and posthumous editions, see W. H. Auden bibliography. Dates refer to first publication or first performance, not of composition.

In the list below, works reprinted in the Complete Works of W. H. Auden are indicated by footnote references.

Books

- Poems (London, 1930; second edn., seven poems substituted, London, 1933; includes poems and Paid on Both Sides: A Charade) (dedicated to Christopher Isherwood).
- The Orators: An English Study (London, 1932, verse and prose; slightly revised edn., London, 1934; revised edn. with new preface, London, 1966; New York 1967) (dedicated to Stephen Spender).
- The Dance of Death (London, 1933, play) (dedicated to Robert Medley and Rupert Doone).
- Poems (New York, 1934; contains Poems [1933 edition], The Orators [1932 edition], and The Dance of Death).
- The Dog Beneath the Skin (London, New York, 1935; play, with Christopher Isherwood) (dedicated to Robert Moody).
- The Ascent of F6 (London, 1936; 2nd edn., 1937; New York, 1937; play, with Christopher Isherwood) (dedicated to John Bicknell Auden).
- Look, Stranger! (London, 1936, poems; US edn., On This Island, New York, 1937) (dedicated to Erika Mann)
- Letters from Iceland (London, New York, 1937; verse and prose, with Louis MacNeice) (dedicated to George Augustus Auden).
- On the Frontier (London, 1938; New York 1939; play, with Christopher Isherwood) (dedicated to Benjamin Britten).
- Journey to a War (London, New York, 1939; verse and prose, with Christopher Isherwood) (dedicated to E. M. Forster).
- Another Time (London, New York 1940; poetry) (dedicated to Chester Kallman).
- The Double Man (New York, 1941, poems; UK edn., New Year Letter, London, 1941) (Dedicated to Elizabeth Mayer).
- For the Time Being (New York, 1944; London, 1945; two long poems: "The Sea and the Mirror: A Commentary on Shakespeare's The Tempest", dedicated to James and Tania Stern, and "For the Time Being: A Christmas Oratorio", in memoriam Constance Rosalie Auden [Auden's mother]).
- The Collected Poetry of W. H. Auden (New York, 1945; includes new poems) (dedicated to Christopher Isherwood and Chester Kallman). Full text.
- The Age of Anxiety: A Baroque Eclogue (New York, 1947; London, 1948; verse; won the 1948 Pulitzer Prize for Poetry) (dedicated to John Betjeman).
- Collected Shorter Poems, 1930–1944 (London, 1950; similar to 1945 Collected Poetry) (dedicated to Christopher Isherwood and Chester Kallman).
- The Enchafèd Flood (New York, 1950; London, 1951; prose) (dedicated to Alan Ansen).
- Nones (New York, 1951; London, 1952; poems) (dedicated to Reinhold and Ursula Niebuhr)
- The Shield of Achilles (New York, London, 1955; poems) (won the 1956 National Book Award for Poetry) (dedicated to Lincoln and Fidelma Kirstein).
- Homage to Clio (New York, London, 1960; poems) (dedicated to E. R. and A. E. Dodds).
- The Dyer's Hand (New York, 1962; London, 1963; essays) (dedicated to Nevill Coghill).
- About the House (New York, London, 1965; poems) (dedicated to Edmund and Elena Wilson).
- Collected Shorter Poems 1927–1957 (London, 1966; New York, 1967) (dedicated to Christopher Isherwood and Chester Kallman).
- Collected Longer Poems (London, 1968; New York, 1969).
- Secondary Worlds (London, New York, 1969; prose) (dedicated to Valerie Eliot).
- City Without Walls and Other Poems (London, New York, 1969) (dedicated to Peter Heyworth).
- A Certain World: A Commonplace Book (New York, London, 1970; quotations with commentary) (dedicated to Geoffrey Grigson).
- Academic Graffiti (London, New York, 1971; poems) (in memoriam Ogden Nash).
- Epistle to a Godson and Other Poems (London, New York, 1972) (dedicated to Orlan Fox).
- Forewords and Afterwords (New York, London, 1973; essays) (dedicated to Hannah Arendt).
- Thank You, Fog: Last Poems (London, New York, 1974) (dedicated to Michael and Marny Yates).

Film scripts and opera libretti

- Coal Face (1935, closing chorus for GPO Film Unit documentary).
- Night Mail (1936, narrative for GPO Film Unit documentary, not published separately except as a programme note).
- Paul Bunyan (1941, libretto for operetta by Benjamin Britten; not published until 1976).
- The Rake's Progress (1951, with Chester Kallman, libretto for an opera by Igor Stravinsky).
- Elegy for Young Lovers (1961, with Chester Kallman, libretto for an opera by Hans Werner Henze).
- The Bassarids (1966, with Chester Kallman, libretto for an opera by Hans Werner Henze based on The Bacchae of Euripides).
- Runner (1962, documentary film narrative for National Film Board of Canada)
- Love's Labour's Lost (1973, with Chester Kallman, libretto for an opera by Nicolas Nabokov, based on Shakespeare's play).

Musical collaborations

- Our Hunting Fathers (1936, song cycle written for Benjamin Britten)
- Hymn to St Cecilia (1942, choral piece composed by Benjamin Britten)
- An Evening of Elizabethan Verse and its Music (1954 recording with the New York Pro Musica Antiqua, director Noah Greenberg; Auden spoke the verse texts)
- The Play of Daniel (1958, verse narration for a production by the New York Pro Musica Antiqua, director Noah Greenberg)
- Hymn to the United Nations, to which he provided the lyrics
