= Chester Kallman =

American poet and librettist (1921–1975)

- Born: January 7, 1921; Brooklyn, New York City, U.S.
- Died: January 18, 1975 (aged 54); Athens, Greece
- Education: Brooklyn College; University of Michigan

Chester Simon Kallman (January 7, 1921 – January 18, 1975) was an American poet, librettist, and translator, best known for collaborating with W. H. Auden on opera librettos for Igor Stravinsky and other composers.

== Life ==
Kallman was born in Brooklyn of Ashkenazi Jewish ancestry. He received his B.A. at Brooklyn College and his M.A. at the University of Michigan. He published three collections of poems, Storm at Castelfranco (1956), Absent and Present (1963), and The Sense of Occasion (1971). He lived most of his adult life in New York, spending his summers in Italy from 1948 through 1957 and in Austria from 1958 through 1974.

In 1963 he moved his winter home from New York to Athens, Greece. He died there of a heart attack on January 18, 1975, eleven days after his 54th birthday. His funeral, in the third Jewish cemetery of Athens, was attended by some of his closest friends and colleagues, such as James Merrill, David Jackson, Tony Parigory, Nelly Liambey, Bernie Winebaum, Rachel Hadas and Alan Ansen. Kallman was the sole beneficiary of Auden's estate but died intestate himself, with the result that the Auden estate was inherited by Kallman's next-of-kin, his father, Edward (1892–1986), a New York dentist then in his eighties.

== Career ==
Together with his lifelong friend (and sometime lover) W. H. Auden, Kallman wrote the libretto for Stravinsky's The Rake's Progress (1951). They also collaborated on two librettos for Hans Werner Henze, Elegy for Young Lovers (1961) and The Bassarids (1966), and on the libretto of Love's Labour's Lost (based on Shakespeare's play) for Nicolas Nabokov (1973). Additionally, they wrote the libretto "Delia, or, A Masque of Night" (1953), intended for Stravinsky but never set to music. They were commissioned to write the lyrics for Man of La Mancha, but Kallman did not work on the project, and the producers decided against using Auden's contributions.

Kallman was the sole author of the libretto of The Tuscan Players for Carlos Chávez (1953, first performed in 1957 as Panfilo and Lauretta).

He and Auden collaborated on a number of libretto translations, notably The Magic Flute (1956) and Don Giovanni (1961). Kallman also translated Verdi's Falstaff (1954), Monteverdi's The Coronation of Poppea (1954) and many other operas.

== Bibliography ==
Poems

- An Elegy (1951). New York: Tibor de Nagy Gallery. (pamphlet poem)
- Storm at Castelfranco (1956). New York: Grove Press.
- Absent and Present: poems (1963). Middletown: Wesleyan University Press.
- The Sense of Occasion: poems (1971). New York: George Braziller.
- Address: To Yannis Boras (1969). N.P.: Galatia P. 'Arditsoglou.

Libretti

- The Rake's Progress (1951, with W. H. Auden, for music by Igor Stravinsky) New York: Boosey & Hawkes.
- Delia, or A Masque of Night (1953, with W. H. Auden; published in Botteghe Oscure XII; never set to music)
- Elegy for Young Lovers (1961, with W. H. Auden, for music by Hans Werner Henze). Mainz: B. Schott's Söhne.
- Love Propitiated (pbd. 1963, for music by Carlos Chavez; first performed as Panfilo and Lauretta, 1957, then as Love Propitated, 1961). New York: Mills Music.
- The Bassarids (1966, with W. H. Auden, for music by Hans Werner Henze). Mainz: B. Schott's Söhne.
- Love's Labour's Lost (1973, with W. H. Auden, for music by Nicolas Nabokov). Berlin: Bote & Bock.

Translations (published)

- Bluebeard's Castle (1952; translation of the libretto by Béla Balázs for the opera by Béla Bartók). New York: Boosey & Hawkes
- Falstaff (1954; translation of the libretto of the opera by Arrigo Boito). New York: G. Ricordi.
- The Magic Flute (1956, with W. H. Auden, translation of the libretto by Emanuel Schikaneder for an NBC Opera Theatre production of the opera by Mozart). New York: Random House.
- Anne Boleyn (1959; translation of the libretto by Felice Romani for the opera by Donizetti). New York: G. Ricordi.
- The Prize Fight (1959; translation of the libretto by Luciano Conosciani for Vieri Tosatti's opera Partita a Pugni). Milan: Ricordi.
- Don Giovanni (1961, with W. H. Auden, translation of the libretto by Lorenzo da Ponte for an NBC Opera Theatre production of the opera by Mozart). New York: Schirmer.
- The Rise and Fall of the City of Mahagonny, translation of the libretto by Bertolt Brecht for the opera by Kurt Weill. (pbd. 1976, with W. H. Auden). Boston: David Godine.
- Arcifanfano, King of Fools (pbd. with a recording, 1992, with W. H. Auden, translation of the libretto by Carlo Goldoni for the opera by Carl Ditters von Dittersdorf).

Editions

- An Elizabethan Song Book (1955, with W. H. Auden and Noah Greenberg). New York: Anchor Books.

== Sources ==
- Humphrey Carpenter, W. H. Auden: A Biography (1981).
- W. H. Auden and Chester Kallman, Libretti and Other Dramatic Writings by W. H. Auden (1988), ed. by Edward Mendelson.
- Dorothy J. Farnan, Auden in Love (1984)
- Thekla Clark, Wystan and Chester (1995).
- Richard Davenport-Hines, Auden (1996)
