= Sweeney Agonistes =

1932 drama written by T. S. Eliot

- First edition 1932
- Original language: English
- Written by: T. S. Eliot
- Setting: London, England; Doris' flat

Premiere
- Date: 6 May 1933
- Place: Vassar College, Poughkeepsie, New York

Sweeney Agonistes by T. S. Eliot was his first attempt at writing a verse drama although he was unable to complete the piece. In 1926 and 1927 he separately published two scenes from this attempt and then collected them in 1932 in a small book under the title Sweeney Agonistes: Fragments of an Aristophanic Melodrama. The scenes are frequently performed together as a one-act play. Sweeney Agonistes is currently available in print in Eliot's Collected Poems: 1909–1962 listed under his "Unfinished Poems" with the "Fragments of an Aristophanic Melodrama" part of the play's original title removed. The scenes are separately titled "Fragment of a Prologue" and "Fragment of an Agon".

== Composition ==
The scholar Kinley Roby notes that Eliot started writing the scene "Fragment of A Prologue" in 1924 and wrote to a friend, the writer Arnold Bennett, about his concept for the unfinished play. Bennett noted that Eliot wanted "to write a drama of modern life (furnished flat sort of people) in a rhythmic prose 'perhaps with certain things in it accentuated by drum-beats.'" Roby also points out that the style of the play is frequently associated with the rhythm of jazz music as well as the "rhythm of the common speech of his time." Other critics, like Marjorie Lightfoot, associated the play with the "conventions of music-hall comedy," and she notes that Eliot never wrote another play with the musical rhythms of Sweeney.

== Characters ==
Sweeney, the title character, only appears in the second scene, "Fragment of an Agon." Eliot had used the character of Sweeney in four poems prior to Sweeney Agonistes: "Sweeney Among the Nightingales" (1918), "Mr. Eliot's Sunday Morning Service" (1918), "Sweeney Erect" (1919) and The Waste Land (1922). Although Sweeney only appears briefly or as a character sketch in the poems and never speaks, in "Fragment of an Agon" he is the main character with most of the dialogue.

The characters in "Fragment of a Prologue" consist of the female prostitutes Doris Dorrance and Dusty who are visited by Sam Wauchope, a former soldier from the Canadian Expeditionary Force, who introduces his war buddies whom he has brought along: Mr. Klipstein and Mr. Krumpacker (two American businessmen) and Captain Horsfall. All of these characters, plus Sweeney, also appear in "Fragment of an Agon" which also includes the minor characters of Swarts and Snow.

The character of Doris also appears with Sweeney in the poem "Sweeney Erect" and Eliot used the name Doris in a collection of three poems published in November 1924 in Chapbook magazine. The third of "Doris's Dream Songs" ("This is the dead land/This is the cactus land") was later incorporated into Eliot's poem "The Hollow Men".

== Notable performances ==
The first performance of Sweeney Agonistes was on 6 May 1933 at Vassar College in Poughkeepsie, New York, under the direction of Hallie Flanagan. The cast was a mixture of students and local amateurs with a physician playing the part of Sweeney. Eliot, who was teaching at Harvard University at the time, managed to attend. He had had a correspondence with Flanagan prior to the performance giving her suggestions on presentation and a brief ending.

In November 1934 Eliot also saw Sweeney in London with friends in a production by the experimental Group Theatre. The following year it was revived by the Group Theatre under the direction of Rupert Doone. Doone had all but Sweeney wear masks until an unmasking at the end. He also added a scene at the end where Sweeney raises a razor and chases a woman. A police whistle is blown and there is a pounding on the door. A woman's scream is heard as the stage lights go down. This production was seen by Eliot's wife, Vivienne (they were separated at this time,) who "wondered how she managed not to faint at the 'absolute horror of the thing'."

A six-cassette package called "The Poet's Voice" was released by Harvard University in 1978 that included Eliot's rendition of "A Fragment of an Agon" recorded at Harvard's Woodberry Poetry Room in 1948.

Directed by Judith Malina and designed by Julian Beck, Sweeney Agonistes was produced by The Living Theatre on a very low budget: 35 dollars. It opened on 2 March 1952, at The Loft, a wooden building still standing on Broadway at West 100th Street, in New York. It concluded their first financially successful production: a program called An Evening of Bohemian Theatre which included Picasso's Desire Trapped by the Tail, preceded by Gertrude Stein's Ladies Voices.

== Interpretation ==
In "The Fragments of a Journey: The Drama in T. S. Eliot's Sweeney Agonistes," David Galef writes, "Through the play's Greek forms, religious symbolism, and jazz syncopation, critics have perceived Christian themes but more as motifs than as underlying structure: the horror of spiritual awareness amidst modern ignorance, and the trepidation of the soul at the brink of salvation."

In the essay "Sweeney and the Jazz Age," Carol H. Smith writes, "What Eliot expresses in this fragmentary play is both the agony of the saint and private anguish and rage of the man trapped in a world of demanding relationships with women. . .In Sweeney's story of violence and horror, sexual love leads to spiritual purgation, and yet this theme is by definition incommunicable to a world terrified of death and unaware of anything beyond it."

Rachel Blau DuPlessis in the essay '"HOO HOO HOO": Some Episodes in the Construction of Modern Whiteness' calls attention to the repeated use of the word "hoo" towards the end of the 1927 "Fragment of an Agon" section and its relation to the use of the same word in Vachel Lindsay's 1914 poem "Congo: (A Study of the Negro Race)," and how the word's use relates to issues of race and racism.

The title was probably inspired by Milton's tragic poem Samson Agonistes (1671, "Samson the Champion").
