= Ernest Radcliffe Bond =

British police commissioner

Deputy Assistant Commissioner Ernest Radcliffe Bond OBE, QPM
- Born: 1 March 1919; Barrow-in-Furness, Cumbria
- Died: 20 November 2003 (aged 84); Welling, Greater London
- Spouse: Mabel Phoebe Isabell Laming
- Relatives: Two sons and two daughters
- Military career
- Allegiance: United Kingdom
- Branch: British Army; Metropolitan Police Service
- Service years: 1935–1946 (army); 1946–1976 (police)
- Rank: Deputy Assistant Commissioner (police); Sergeant
- Nickname: Commander X
- Units: Scots Guards; No. 8 (Guards) Commando; Special Service Brigade (became Special Air Service); Metropolitan Police Service
- Conflicts: Norway; Tripoli

Ernest Radcliffe Bond, OBE, QPM (1 March 1919 – 20 November 2003), also called Commander X, was a British soldier, and later policeman famous for his service in the Metropolitan Police Service.

Bond experienced the Fraud Squad, the Flying Squad, the Murder Squad, and became the first commander of the newly formed Bomb Squad (later the Anti-Terrorist Branch, now merged into Counter Terrorism Command). His notable achievements in the bomb squad were negotiating the rise of The Angry Brigade, eventually jailing several members. The other major event he negotiated as commander with the Bomb Squad was the Balcombe Street siege, in which two people were taken hostage by four Irish Republican Army members, who demanded a plane to Ireland. Bond, answering the demands, refused saying that the police "are not going to make any deals". The gunmen surrendered, the event a success for police with no casualties on either side.

== Early life ==
Ernest Radcliffe Bond was born on 1 March 1919 in Barrow-in-Furness, where he lived in a "close-knit community" at 58 John Street. His father, William Edward Bond, was a shipyard worker, and his mother was Annie Elizabeth Bond née Radcliffe. Bond was an apprentice French polisher after he left school.

== Military career ==
Bond joined the British Army on 16 September 1935, entering the 2nd battalion of the Scots Guards. His objective was to fight in any short engagement that he could, and then to become a police officer. He was sent to Palestine to help with the Arab Revolt. However, his plan was scuppered by the outbreak of World War II, and he stayed with his battalion, serving first in Norway as a sergeant. After a short time in No. 8 (Guards) Commando, where he served in a group of units under Robert Laycock's command fighting in the Middle East in 1941, by that time Bond had been promoted to the rank of sergeant. The unit was disbanded, and he journeyed to North Africa with his original battalion in the Scots Guards, fighting in the Eighth Army.

In 1941, still in North Africa, Bond joined "L" Detachment in the Special Service Brigade, which became David Stirling's Special Air Service. Bond was part of a parachute training mission in Kabrit, Egypt, against the airfields of Gazala and Tmimi. The conditions were "atrocious", and his aeroplane crashed in desert. He became a prisoner of war for the remainder of the conflict.

He was reported to have spent four years in jail in his military career.

== Police career ==
When Bond was released from his imprisonment by the Axis, he was demobilised in 1946 and entered the Metropolitan Police with the warrant number 128434, realising his pre-war ambition. He was 'on the beat' for 2 years, working in Lambeth with 'M' division. His division became 'E' division, patrolling Holborn, when he decided to enter the Criminal Investigation Department (CID) in 1948. He experienced another promotion in 1957, to become a Detective Sergeant; "he began to develop a reputation for his discerning skill as a detective." Bond rapidly experienced both the Fraud Squad and the Flying Squad; and in 1963 joined the Murder Squad at the rank of Detective Inspector.

"They were a cunning lot the Angry Brigade, well wrapped up in that anarchist movement. They were belligerent and very "anti" and there was no sense that they were sorry for what they had done. Right from the start, there were allegations that we'd [the police] planted this and planted that. It was the most disgraceful trial I've ever seen in my experience."

— Bond, quoted in The Guardian

Bond joined the Bomb Squad, newly formed in January 1971 due to concern over The Angry Brigade. Bond became the unit's first commander on 23 June 1971, being promoted to that position in 1969. The unit served at Tintagel House, and Bond's name was theoretically meant to be kept secret and he should be called 'Commander X', so that he was not bombed, but journalists have since claimed to have known his name within days of his appointment. The press lauded Commander X as a "mystery supremo to hunt down the Angry Brigade." The Angry Brigade was a new political group; "a small group [around 200] of leftwing radicals and anarchists," who claimed responsibility for about 20 small bombings which began on 20 November 1970, with the bombing of a BBC van. At its formation, the Bomb Squad comprised around 30 men, one third from CID, the rest from Special Branch. The Angry Brigade's decline came in 1971, when various conspirators were arrested. At the 1971–72 trial, the nine conspirators were denied bail at Clerkenwell Court after Bond opposed the move, and the judge, J Purcell, "remanded all nine in custody for a week." There were concerns that the police had "over-reached themselves." The Angry Brigade member John Barker later said that "the police framed a guilty man," and Bond was called an "old-fashioned plod" by a defendant. He told the Purcell that "I am quite certain that, sooner or later, we would have had somebody killed." Due to his success, in 1972 he was awarded the Queen's Police Medal and promoted to Deputy Assistant Commissioner (Operations).

The Irish Republican Army (IRA) also had a bombing campaign ongoing, and in December 1975 Bond "saturated" the centre of London with plainclothes police officers. Four IRA members took two people hostage in Balcombe Street, following a police chase which involved a shoot out on 7 December. The terrorists called the police, in a call which was routed to Bond; who refused their demands of a plane to fly to Ireland, proclaiming that

"They are not going anywhere and they are not getting any plane to Ireland. We are not going to make any deals at all."

The gunmen gave up on 12 December, their surrender sparking fears of reprisals, after what Bond called a "rather humiliating episode," Bond "masterminded" the operation to regain the hostages. He retired the following year, in 1976, and received the Order of the British Empire in the New Year's honours list. Upon his retirement in February 1976, he had served in the police for 30 years, full of "exemplary conduct." In his time, Bond received 12 Commissioner's Commendations and 7 for "courage, diligence and determination in the course of investigations."

== Personal life ==
Bond married the 23-year-old Mabel Phoebe Isabell née Laming on 29 October 1939, the daughter of a dock worker, Alfred Thomas Laming. They had two sons and two daughters together, who all survived both their parents. When Bond had retired, he indulged his interests in decorating and gardening, and remained a Freemason. Mabel died in 1992, and on 20 November 2003, Bond died of prostate cancer in Welling, in his home.
