= Hedli Anderson =

British actor and singer (1907–1990)

Antoinette Millicent Hedley Anderson (1907 – 1990) was an English singer and actor.

Known as Hedli Anderson, she studied singing in England and Germany before returning to London in 1934. Anderson joined the Group Theatre, and performed in cabaret and in the initial productions of plays by W. H. Auden, Christopher Isherwood and Louis MacNeice. She married MacNeice in 1942; the couple had one daughter. They separated in 1960.

Among the composers and lyricists who wrote songs for her were Auden, MacNeice, Benjamin Britten, Elisabeth Lutyens and William Alwyn. Auden's "Funeral Blues" (also known as "Stop all the clocks", later to become famous through its use in the film Four Weddings and a Funeral) was originally written for Anderson and set to music by Britten as part of Auden and Isherwood's play The Ascent of F6 (1936), then revised by Auden as a separate poem.

In later years she owned, and cooked in, the Spinnaker restaurant in Scilly, Kinsale, County Cork, which specialised in seafood and Mediterranean and North African food.
