= Protection Command =

Command within London's Metropolitan Police

The Protection Command is one of the commands within the Specialist Operations directorate of London's Metropolitan Police Service. The command specialises in protective security and has two branches: Royalty and Specialist Protection (RaSP), providing protection to the royal family and close protection to government officials, and Parliamentary and Diplomatic Protection (PaDP), providing uniformed security to government buildings, officials and diplomats. In contrast with the vast majority of British police officers, many members of the Protection Command routinely carry firearms in the course of their duties and all are authorised firearms officers.

== Branches ==
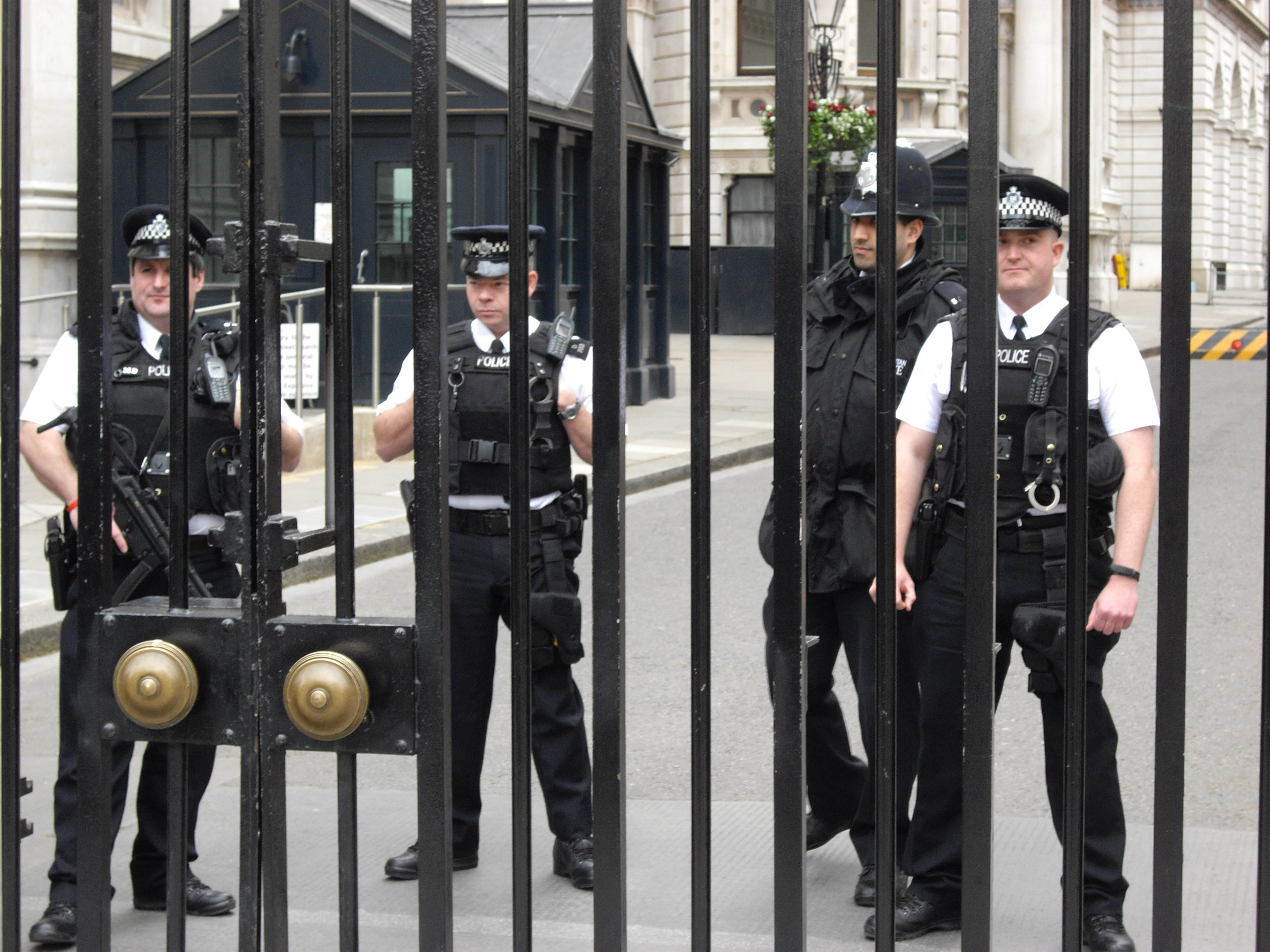
Armed officers behind the security gates at Downing Street in London

In April 2015, the branches of Protection Command and elements of Security Command were merged into two distinct branches under the control of Protection Command: Royalty and Specialist Protection (RaSP; a merger of Royalty Protection and Specialist Protection) and Parliamentary and Diplomatic Protection (PaDP; a merger of the Diplomatic Protection Group and the Palace of Westminster Division of Security Command).

=== Royalty and Specialist Protection ===
With several palaces within the Metropolitan Police District, the Met provided special protection officers to the royal family from its beginnings in 1829, with these usually selected from its Special Branch after its formation in 1884. Royalty protection officers at that time were attached for administrative purposes to "A" Division, although they were part of A8 Branch within "A" Department at New Scotland Yard.

This changed in 1978 when the Royalty Protection Branch was formed as a separate non-divisional specialist unit. That later became a Command numbered SO14 within Specialist Operations and was finally merged with the Specialist Protection Command (SO1) in April 2015 to form Royalty and Specialist Protection (RaSP).

The department has three service areas:

1. Close protection for members of the Royal Family, government ministers (which includes the Prime Minister) and visiting heads of state.
2. The Special Escort Group (SEG) who provide mobile armed protection to members of the royal family and government ministers
3. Armed security at royal residences in London, Windsor and Scotland.

=== Parliamentary and Diplomatic Protection ===
Diplomatic Protection originated in November 1974 as a result of the Vienna Convention on Diplomatic Relations. It was placed under Chief Superintendent Douglas Cree as A8(3) Branch, again within "A" Department, becoming A11 Branch by 1982. In 1980 one of its officers at that time, Trevor Lock, became involved in the Iranian Embassy Siege. In 1983 A11 Branch became RDPD(D), one half of the Royalty and Diplomatic Protection Department (RDPD) and later still SO16, again within Specialist Operations.

Diplomatic Protection Group (SO16) and Palace of Westminster Division (SO17) were then merged to form the Parliamentary and Diplomatic Protection (PaDP) in April 2015. PaDP provides armed and unarmed protection of embassies, missions and the Parliamentary Estate and residential protection for high-profile government ministers. They are responsible for access control and security at Downing Street and New Scotland Yard.

PaDP was the command in which Police Constable Keith Palmer, who was killed in an attack at Westminster in 2017, worked, as did convicted kidnapper, murderer and rapist Wayne Couzens who used his status as a Police Officer to deceive his victim Sarah Everard by falsely arresting her.

== See also ==
- List of protective service agencies
- Counter Terrorism Command
- Territorial Support Group
- United States Secret Service
- Fixated Threat Assessment Centre
- Special Protection Group (India)
- Federal Protective Service (United States)
- Federal Protective Service (Russia)
