= Counter Terrorism Policing =

Collaboration of police forces in the UK

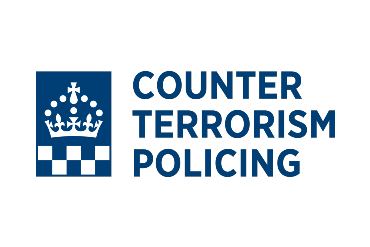
Logo of Counter Terrorism Policing Updated for King Charles III.

Counter Terrorism Policing (CTP) is the national collaboration of police forces working to prevent, deter, and investigate terrorism in the United Kingdom.

The network is governed by the National Police Collaboration Agreement Relating to Counter Terrorism Activities Made Under Section 22A of the Police Act 1996. The network is accountable to the United Kingdom Government and the National Police Chiefs' Council Counter Terrorism Coordination Committee which is chaired by the Metropolitan Police Service Assistant Commissioner of Specialist Operations (ACSO) who also acts as the Head of Counter Terrorism Policing. The network is also functionally coordinated by two Senior National Coordinators who are usually Metropolitan Police Service Deputy Assistant Commissioners co-located within the Counter Terrorism Command. As of July 2025, Laurence Taylor has been Head of Counter Terrorism Policing, replacing Matt Jukes.

Counter Terrorism Policing stretches across the United Kingdom and sees specialist officers and staff working with the Home Office, MI5 and other intelligence, security and criminal justice agencies around the world. It is made up of dedicated regional Counter Terrorism Units and national police units and is responsible for the delivery of the policing contribution to the CONTEST strategy.

The Australian Federal Police's Joint Counter-Terrorism Teams, Canada's Integrated National Security Enforcement Teams, and the United States' Joint Terrorism Task Force model can be seen as analogous to Counter Terrorism Policing.

== Counter Terrorism Coordination Committee ==
The Counter Terrorism Coordination Committee (CTCC) of the National Police Chiefs' Council is a national coordination body made of chief officers of the nine regional lead counter terrorism police forces and other thematic leads alongside senior representatives of government departments and other agencies including the Home Office and MI5. It is chaired by Metropolitan Police Service Assistant Commissioner of Specialist Operations.

The CTCC is the focal point for counter terrorism policing and related issues and is responsible for developing national counter terrorism and domestic extremism strategic policy through the Counter Terrorism Policing Headquarters (CTPHQ). The CTCC also liaises with government and other partners on behalf of UK police forces. The CTCC is also staffed by a small number of chief police officers dedicated full-time to providing strategic direction and coordination relating to particular counter terrorism policing themes.

The Counter Terrorism Policing Senior Leadership as defined by the National Counter Terrorism Collaboration Agreement as the CTCC Chair, Vice Chair(s)s, the Senior National Coordinator Pursue, the Senior National Coordinator Protect & Prepare, the Director General of CTPHQ, and the Director of Counter Terrorism Resources.

== Counter Terrorism Policing Headquarters ==
The Counter Terrorism Policing Headquarters is responsible for developing policy and strategy and providing a single national voice on behalf of the Counter Terrorism Policing. The CTPHQ also coordinates national projects and programmes, provides administrative and support services to the national network, advises the government on budgets and resourcing for counter terrorism policing in England and Wales.

== Counter Terrorism Policing Operations Centre ==
Within the CTPHQ is the Counter Terrorism Policing Operations Centre serving as the central operational command made up of units that provide operational support to Counter Terrorism Policing. Teams within the Operations Centre are:

- Ports Team
- Intelligence Team
- Firearms Suppression Team
- Coordination Centre

== Senior National Coordinators ==
The Senior National Coordinator for Pursue is responsible for coordinating counter terrorism investigations. The Senior National Coordinator for Protect & Prepare is responsible for advising and coordinating national Counter Terrorism Policing protection and preparation activities.

== Regional Counter Terrorism Units ==
Counter Terrorism Policing is made up of eleven regional Counter Terrorism Units (CTUs) and regional Counter Terrorism Intelligence Units (CTIUs) which bring together intelligence, operations and investigation functions around the United Kingdom to help prevent, disrupt and prosecute terrorist activities. Units are regionally based and resourced by regional police forces and are composed of detectives, financial and cyber investigators, community contact teams, intelligence analysts, and forensic specialists. Each CTU provides coordination and specialist support for their respective regions. The CTUs are located as follows:

- Counter Terrorism Policing North West led by the Greater Manchester Police with Cheshire Constabulary, Cumbria Constabulary, Isle of Man Constabulary, Lancashire Constabulary, and Merseyside Police.
- Counter Terrorism Policing North East led by the West Yorkshire Police with Cleveland Police, Durham Constabulary, Humberside Police, Northumbria Police, North Yorkshire Police, and South Yorkshire Police.
- Counter Terrorism Policing South East led by the Thames Valley Police for Hampshire Constabulary, Kent Police, Surrey Police, and Sussex Police.
- Counter Terrorism Policing West Midlands led by the West Midlands Police with Staffordshire Police, Warwickshire Police, and West Mercia Police.
- Counter Terrorism Command led by the Metropolitan Police Service with City of London Police.

The Regional Counter Terrorism Intelligence Units are also resourced by the police forces in their respective areas and carry out primarily intelligence gathering operations. The CTIUs are located as follows:

- Counter Terrorism Policing South West led by the Avon and Somerset Police with Devon and Cornwall Police, Dorset Police, Gloucestershire Constabulary, Wiltshire Police, States of Guernsey Police Service, and States of Jersey Police.
- Counter Terrorism Policing Wales led by the South Wales Police with Dyfed–Powys Police, Gwent Police, and North Wales Police.
- Counter Terrorism Policing Eastern led by the Bedfordshire Police with Essex Police, Cambridgeshire Constabulary, Hertfordshire Constabulary, Suffolk Constabulary, and Norfolk Constabulary.
- Counter Terrorism Policing East Midlands led by the Derbyshire Police with Leicestershire Police, Lincolnshire Police, Northamptonshire Police, and Nottinghamshire Police.
- Scotland Counter Terrorism Intelligence Unit led by the Police Scotland.
- Northern Ireland Counter Terrorism Intelligence Unit led by the Police Service of Northern Ireland.

=== Special Branches ===
In addition to the regional counter terrorism units, local Special Branches assist in protecting national security and are in some police forces managed and tasked by the regional counter terrorism units.

== See also ==
- MI5
- Office for Security and Counter-Terrorism
- National Counter Terrorism Security Office
- Counter Terrorism Internet Referral Unit
- CONTEST
- Operation Temperer
- United Kingdom National Security Council
- United Kingdom National Security Strategy
- Joint Terrorism Analysis Centre
- Civil Contingencies Secretariat
- Cabinet Office Briefing Room
- Metropolitan Police Service
  - Specialist Operations
  - Counter Terrorism Command
  - Protection Command
  - Counter Terrorist Specialist Firearms Officer
  - Authorised Firearms Officer and Armed Response Vehicle
- United Kingdom intelligence agencies
- United Kingdom law enforcement agencies
