= Funeral Blues =

Poem by W. H. Auden

"Funeral Blues", or "Stop all the clocks", is a poem by W. H. Auden which first appeared in the 1936 play The Ascent of F6. Auden substantially rewrote the poem several years later as a cabaret song for the singer Hedli Anderson. Both versions were set to music by the composer Benjamin Britten. The second version was first published in 1938 and was titled "Funeral Blues" in Auden's 1940 Another Time. The poem experienced renewed popularity after being read in the film Four Weddings and a Funeral (1994), which also led to increased attention on Auden's other work. It has since been cited as one of the most popular modern poems in the United Kingdom.

== Writing and publication ==
The poem was five stanzas long when it first appeared in the 1936 verse play The Ascent of F6, written by Auden and Christopher Isherwood. In the play, the poem was put to music by the composer Benjamin Britten and read as a blues work. Hedli Anderson, an English singer, was a lead performer in The Ascent of F6.

Auden decided to re-write several poems for Anderson to perform as cabaret songs, including "Funeral Blues", and was working on them as early as 1937. The re-write was likely completed by the end of that year. Britten again worked as the composer. Auden kept the first two stanzas from his initial version, but replaced the last three with two new stanzas, as those verses made enough references to the play that they could not be understood outside of it. They were also of relatively poor quality, according to the poet Joseph Warren Beach. This version was first published in the 1938 anthology Poems of To-Day, Third Series, by the English Association, and also appeared in The Year's Poetry, 1938, compiled by Denys Kilham Roberts and Geoffrey Grigson (London, 1938), titled "Blues". Auden then included the poem in his poetry collection Another Time (Random House, 1940) as one of four poems headed "Four Cabaret Songs for Miss Hedli Anderson"; the poem itself was titled "Funeral Blues". The poem appeared in Auden's 1945 Collected Poetry as Song No. XXX, and was similarly untitled in the 1950 and 1966 editions, in 1966's Collected Shorter Poems 1927-1957 is became Song IX in a sequence 'Twelves Songs', and 1977's The English Auden 1927-1939 rendered it just 'XXXIV' in the section of the book Poems 1931-1936'; these being titles over which Auden approved and had control over during his lifetime.

Britten wrote a setting of the poem for chorus and instrumental group as part of his incidental music for the first production of The Ascent of F6 in 1937, and later arranged it for solo voice and piano in a collection of settings of Auden poems under the title Cabaret Songs.

== Analysis ==
The English scholar Seamus Perry notes similarities between Auden's re-write and the poems of Cole Porter, which Perry considers "ingenious" and "witty". He also feels that the poem is not as "light" as Porter's work or its cabaret origins suggest. According to Perry, the poem shows that "often the true immensity of love is learned through realising the enormity of its absence", specifically citing the line "I thought that love would last for ever: I was wrong". The final two lines of the poem as published in Another Time read "Pour away the ocean and sweep up the woods./For nothing now can ever come to any good." These lines do not rhyme, but would if the first ended "wood" rather than "woods". Perry considers this intentional, saying it feels almost as though the poem itself becomes "momentarily distracted by grief".

By presenting the poem in the imperative, Auden sketches attention to it, according to the scholar John G. Blair. In 2009 the scholar Heidi Hartwig argued that the poem could be read and interpreted in many different ways, depending on how and by whom it was presented. Joseph Warren Beach notes that in the revised version of the poem, the first two stanzas are tied to the everyday world, referencing mundane things such as airplanes and telephones. Conversely, the two new stanzas reference things more common to typical ballads, such as the ocean or the heavens. The two halves "have an underlying tone of cosmic disillusion characteristic of the interwar period." He considers that piecing the halves together makes the poem "lively" and appealing to various readers.

== Appearances and reception ==
The poem is read in its entirety in the 1994 British romantic comedy film Four Weddings and a Funeral. The poem is read by Matthew, a character portrayed by John Hannah, at the funeral of his partner Gareth. After the film's release, Auden's work saw increased attention, particularly "Funeral Blues". A collection of ten of Auden's poems titled Tell Me the Truth About Love—including "Funeral Blues"—was published by Faber and Faber upon the film's release and sold around a quarter of a million copies. A 1999 poll conducted by the BBC placed the poem as the United Kingdom's fifth most popular "modern" poem. The introduction to a 2000 poetry anthology published by Miles Kelly Publishing credited the poem's reading in Four Weddings and a Funeral with showing how poetry could be "cool". In 2013 "Funeral Blues" was described by the English scholar Abbie Garrington as "perhaps Auden's best‐known work".

The poem is often read as a memorial. An article in The New Yorker describes the poem as serving as the "elegy of the AIDS era" in the 1980s. It is the English contribution to the statue commemorating the Heysel Stadium disaster, where a retaining wall collapsed, resulting in 39 deaths on 29 May 1985, when Liverpool F.C. played Juventus FC in the European Cup final. Metropolitan Police Commissioner Cressida Dick read the poem in full at the funeral of police officer Keith Palmer, who was fatally stabbed in the 2017 Westminster attack.
