= The Ascent of F6 =

1936 book by W. H. Auden and Christopher Isherwood

- First UK edition
- Author: W. H. Auden, Christopher Isherwood
- Publication date: 1936

The Ascent of F6: A Tragedy in Two Acts, by W. H. Auden and Christopher Isherwood, was the second and most successful play in the Auden–Isherwood collaboration, first published in 1936. It was a major contribution to English poetic drama in the 1930s. It has been seen as a parable about will, leadership and the nature of power: matters of increasing concern in Europe as that decade progressed.

== Plot ==
The play tells the story of Michael Ransom, a climber, who, against his better judgement, accepts the offer of the British press and government to sponsor an expedition to the peak of F6, a mountain on the border of a British colony and a colony of the fictional country of Ostnia. Ransom is destroyed by his haste to complete the expedition ahead of the Ostnian climbers.

== Background ==
The play is dedicated to Auden's geologist brother John Bicknell Auden who had taken part in an expedition near the Karakoram mountain K2.

The play is widely regarded as an allegory of Auden's own temptation to be a public figure; this interpretation was first offered by R. G. Collingwood in The Principles of Art (1938).

The play was published in three slightly different versions: the first English edition in 1936, the American edition in 1937, and a second English edition in 1937.

Auden personally invited Benjamin Britten to write the incidental music for the play. Britten composed the music in February 1937, the month of the play's first production, including a choral setting of "Stop all the clocks" (titled "Funeral Blues").

== Production history ==
The play was first produced at the Mercury Theatre, London, on 26 February 1937, with incidental music by Benjamin Britten conducted from the piano by Brian Easdale. Directed by Rupert Doone, the cast included William Devlin as Michael Ransom, Dorothy Holmes-Gore as Mrs Ransom, and Hedli Anderson as the Singer. After its initial run, The Ascent of F6 received 17 performances over the next two years. It was broadcast live on television by the BBC on 31 May 1937, William Devlin again playing Michael Ransom.

== Bibliography ==
- Auden, W. H., and Christopher Isherwood. Plays and other dramatic writings by W. H. Auden, 1928-1939, ed. by Edward Mendelson (1988).
- Carpenter, Humphrey. Benjamin Britten: A Biography. London: Faber and Faber (1992). ISBN 0571143245.
- Mitchell, Donald (ed). Letters From a Life: The Selected Letters of Benjamin Britten, Volume I, 1923–1939. London: Faber and Faber (1991). ISBN 057115221X.
- Wallace, Helen. Boosey & Hawkes: The publishing story. London: Boosey & Hawkes (2007). ISBN 9780851625140.
