= War Crimes Unit =

Specialist unit of the Metropolitan Police Service

The Metropolitan Police War Crimes Unit was a specialist unit of the Metropolitan Police Service investigating cases relating to the War Crimes Act 1991. It was formed on 28 May 1991 and - with no more leads on any such cases remaining after the trial of Anthony Sawoniuk - it was disbanded in summer 1999 and its work transferred to the Organised Crime Group, part of the Specialist Operations (SO) Department. As of 2015 such work was carried out by Counter Terrorism Command, also part of Specialist Operations.
