= Robert Medley =

English painter

- Born: Charles Robert Owen Medley; 19 December 1905; London, England
- Died: 20 October 1994 (aged 88); London, England
- Education: Byam Shaw School of Art; Royal Academy Schools; Slade School of Fine Art
- Known for: Painting, teaching, design work

Photo by Allan Warren, 1988

Charles Robert Owen Medley CBE, RA, (19 December 1905 – 20 October 1994), also known as Robert Medley, was an English painter in both abstract and figurative styles, who also worked as a teacher and theatre designer. He held several teaching positions in both London and later Rome. He was an official war artist in WWII.

Over his long career his style evolved in several phases, reflecting wider changes in British painting.

== Biography ==
A St John's Ambulance Examination in Progress, 1940, Imperial War Museum

=== Early life ===
Medley was born in London, one of six children to Charles Medley, a highly successful copyright lawyer who was friends with many writers of the day. He was educated at Gresham's School in Holt, Norfolk from 1919 to 1923, before briefly attending the Byam Shaw School of Art. During 1924 Medley studied art at the Royal Academy Schools but soon switched to the Slade School of Fine Art and then completed his art training by spending two years, from 1926 to 1928, in Paris.

At Gresham's School Medley was the friend of W. H. Auden, and first suggested that Auden might write poetry, although Medley did not know at the time that he had this effect. As described in his memoir, Drawn from the Life, in his early years Medley believed he was heterosexual and therefore did not understand Auden's erotic intentions toward him until they spent a single weekend together after both had left school. Until he was seduced at 19, he recalled later, "I was still under the illusion that I was entirely heterosexual."

=== 1920s & 1930s ===
In Paris in 1926 Medley met a dancer, Rupert Doone, with whom he lived for the rest of Doone's life. During the 1930s he worked mostly in various avant-garde styles. Between 1929 and 1934 Medley worked with Duncan Grant and Vanessa Bell. From 1929 onwards Medley began to exhibit paintings with the London Group. In 1931 Medley held his first solo show at the Cooling Galleries in 1931 and began teaching at the Chelsea At School the same year. He also exhibited at the London Artists' Association in 1932 but the majority of his time was spent on design work for the theatre. In 1932 he and Doone jointly founded the Group Theatre, for which Medley served as artistic director, either designing the Group's productions himself or supervising designs that included masks by Henry Moore. Medley and Doone invited Auden to write plays for the Group. Through Auden, Medley met Stephen Spender, Louis MacNeice and others who became associated with the Group Theatre. Medley had a painting in the International Surrealist Exhibition in London in 1936 and in 1937 Medley founded the Artists' International Association, AIA, which promoted socialist and avant-garde art. In 1938 he chaired a widely reported debate between Realists and Surrealists organized by the AIA.

=== World War Two ===
At the beginning of the Second World War Medley served as an Air Raid Precautions warden until he was offered a three-month commission by the War Artists' Advisory Committee, WAAC, to go to France to record troop landings for the British Expeditionary Force. Medley's appointment was blocked by MI5 who considered him to be "closely associated with subversive Communist doctrine". Instead WAAC offered Medley a contract to record air raid precautions in the north-east of England and he spent an enjoyable two months based in Newcastle upon Tyne doing just that. Earlier he had, like many other artists, put his name forward to undertake camouflage work for the war effort and when his WAAC contract was completed, Medley was sent to Cairo as a camouflage officer and spent the rest of the war there.

=== Later life ===
Returning from the war, Medley and Donne lived together in London where Medley taught at the Chelsea Art School, now part of the Chelsea College of Art and Design, from 1945 to 1949. One of his 'Cyclist' series of paintings, composed between 1950 and 1952, won a prize at the Festival of Britain 60 Paintings for 51 exhibition. Medley was a visiting lecturer at the Slade and returned there full-time in 1958 as Head of the department of Theatre Design, a post he held until 1966. The Cast Room at the Slade inspired Medley to create his 'Antique Room' series of paintings. In the late 1950s Medley painted a series of industrial landscapes in the Gravesend area.

In the 1960s Medley turned to abstraction, but in later years returned to figurative painting. These last paintings are the most widely respected of his works. A retrospective exhibition of his work was held at the Whitechapel Art Gallery in 1963 and in 1966 he became chairman of the faculty of painting at the British School in Rome. In 1982 he was appointed CBE and in 1985 he was elected to the Royal Academy. A centenary tribute at James Hyman Fine Art in 2005 was accompanied by a catalogue with essays about Medley's work. Medley was also an important supporter of emerging out gay artists studying at the Slade who included Mario Dubsky and Derek Jarman.

== Work in public collections ==
There are many paintings in British public collections.

- Rhododendrons (1950) at the Tate Gallery
- Portrait of Maggi Hambling (1988) at the Ashmolean Museum
- Mottisfont Abbey, Hampshire - Landscape

== Work in private galleries ==
- Robert Medley page at the James Hyman Gallery
- Robert Medley page at The Art Stable Gallery
