= Parliamentary and Diplomatic Protection =

British specialist policing unit in London

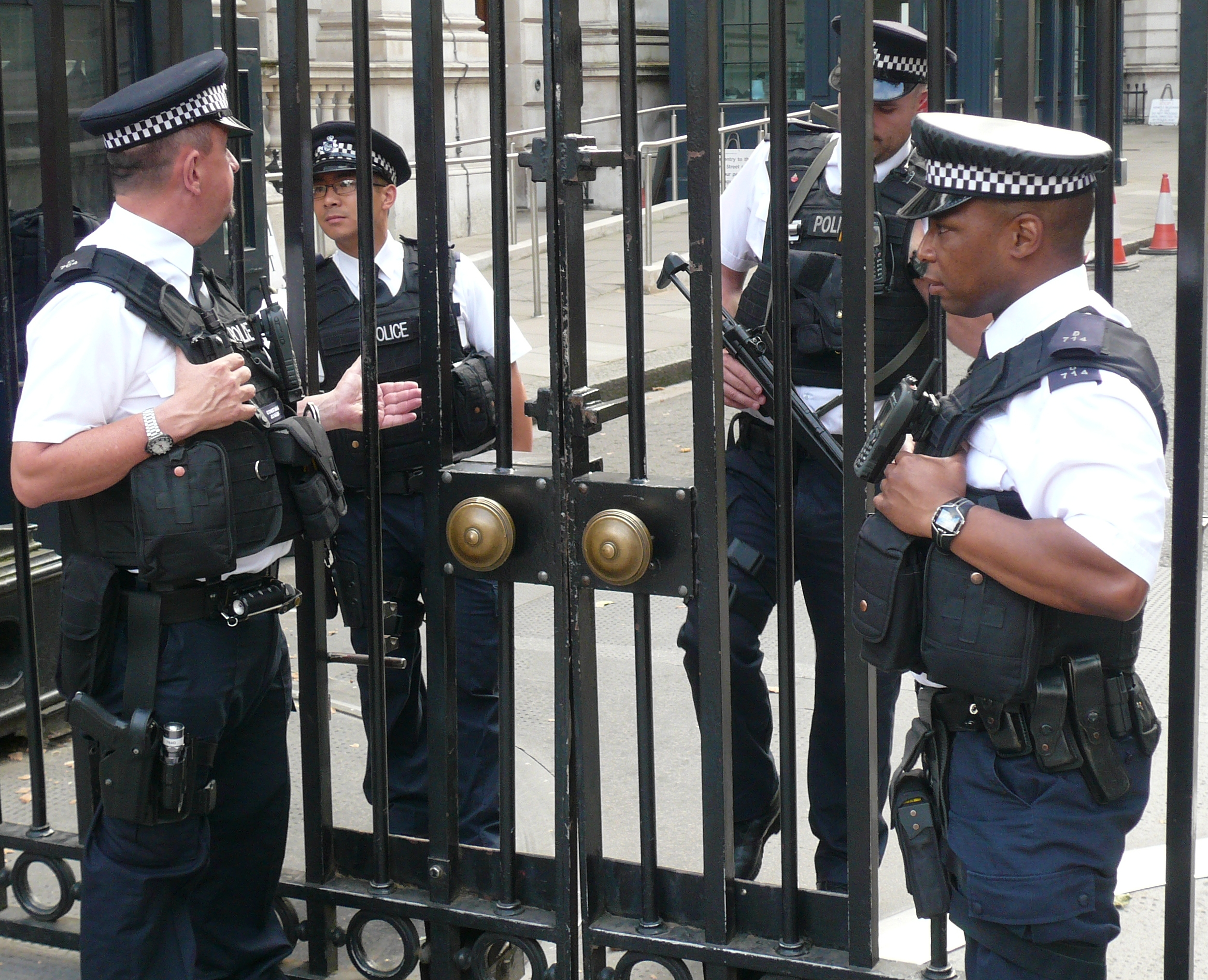
PaDP officers guarding the main gates at Downing Street in London

Parliamentary and Diplomatic Protection (PaDP) is a branch of the Protection Command within the Specialist Operations directorate of London's Metropolitan Police Service.

== Duties ==
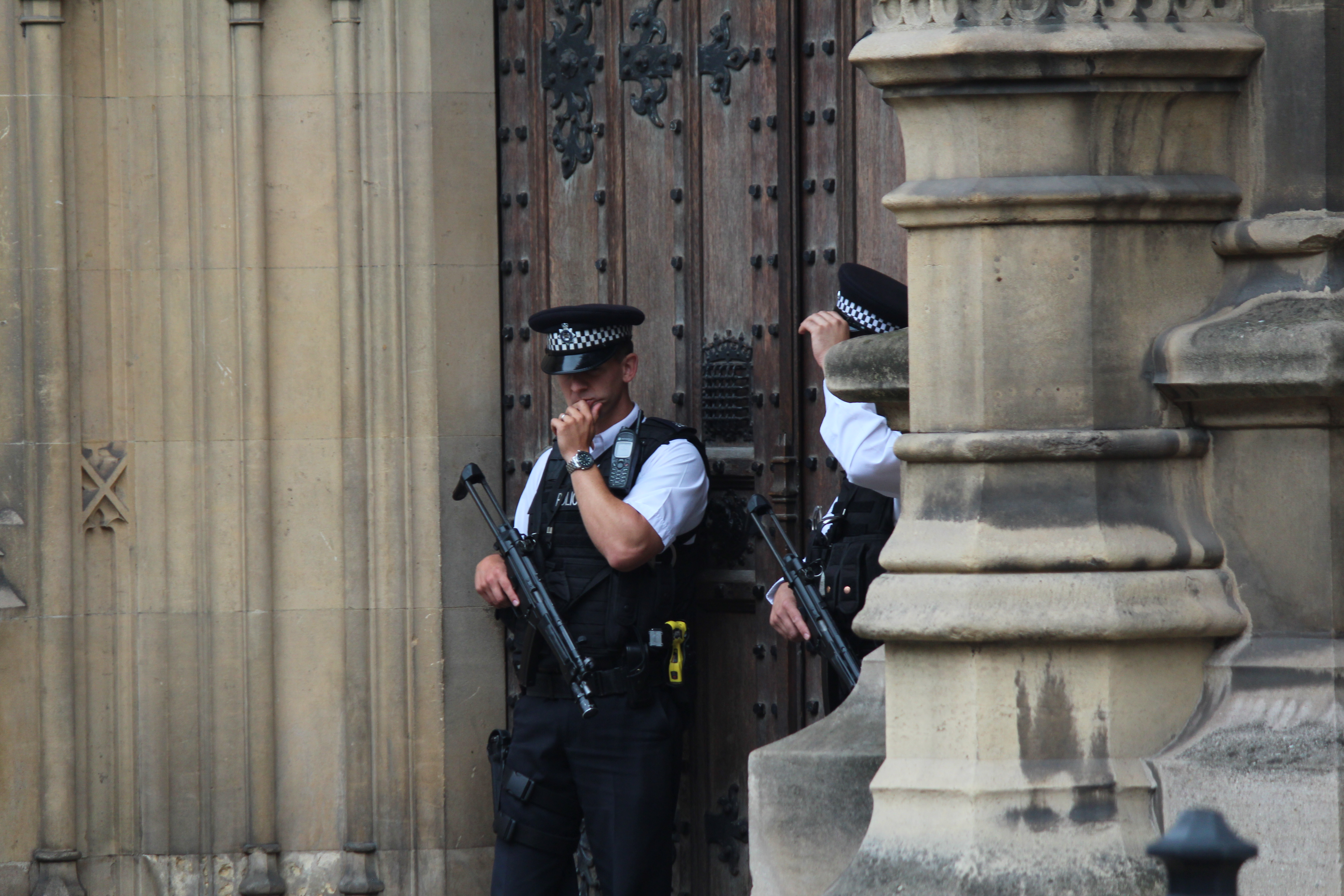
Two PaDP officers outside the Palace of Westminster in 2016

A unit of the Metropolitan Police Service, PaDP is responsible for providing officers (armed and unarmed) to protect the Palace of Westminster, which contains the Houses of Parliament; it protects government ministers and provides advice on threat levels. Within PaDP is a Parliamentary Liaison and Investigation Team (PLaIT), which is responsible for coordinating with local police forces and with the Parliamentary Security Department (PSD) that reports to the Speaker of the House of Commons and the Lord Speaker of the House of Lords. In addition, PaDP is responsible for security at Downing Street, which is home to the Prime Minister and Chancellor of the Exchequer.

PaDP is also responsible for the protection of diplomatic missions in the UK, consistent with the Vienna Convention on Diplomatic Relations (which requires that a host country protect embassies and consulates, while preserving their inviolability). PaDP provides armed and unarmed security in both police cars and foot patrols, and uniformed and plainclothes operations.

== History ==
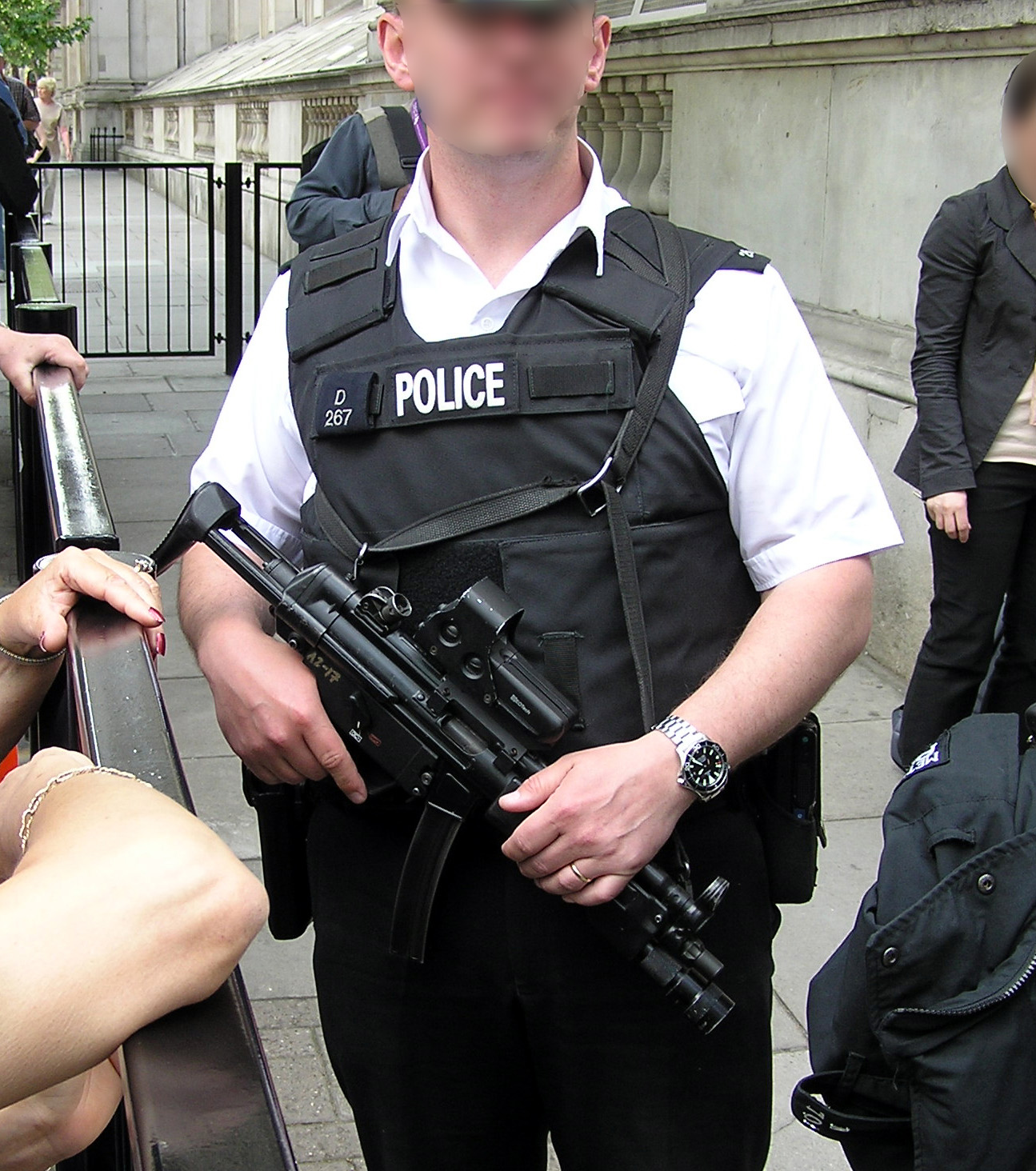
An armed officer on duty near the entrance to Downing Street

PaDP was created in April 2015 through a merger of the Metropolitan Police Service's Diplomatic Protection Group (SO16) and the Palace of Westminster Division (SO17). It is the largest armed police unit in the UK.

The Diplomatic Protection Group (DPG) was originally formed in November 1974 as a branch of the Metropolitan Police Service devoted to the protection of diplomatic missions in Central London. DPG officers were also assigned to support security operations for royal weddings, state visits, and other special events. The group was elevated to a command in 1979 and later (with royalty protection) forming part of the Royalty and Diplomatic Protection Department.

The Palace of Westminster Division (SO17) was a branch of the Specialist Operations Directorate within the Metropolitan Police Service. In accordance with a contract and Special Service Agreement with Parliament, SO17 was responsible for security at the Palace of Westminster and the rest of the Parliamentary Estate.

In April 2022, after Met and IOPC investigations resulted in dozens of charges of on-duty rape against serving PaDP officers, Acting Metropolitan Police Commissioner Stephen House told the Home Affairs Select Committee that his inquiries into PaDP's culture had found the unit suffered from a lack of supervision because "[PaDP officers] don't see their supervisors enough, supervisors don’t know the officers well enough [and] there aren't enough [supervisors]."

=== Notable incidents ===
On 27 December 1972, police constable (PC) Peter Slimon, en route to his post protecting the Jordanian embassy, ran across an attempted bank robbery in progress at the National Westminster Bank at Kensington High Street. A gun battle ensued (a very rare event in London at that time). Slimon fatally shot one bank robber and wounded another; Slimon was himself wounded by gunfire. Slimon was awarded the George Medal for "outstanding resolution, devotion to duty and courage of a very high order" in tackling the robbers.

During the Iranian Embassy siege of 1980, PC Trevor Lock was taken hostage along with the embassy staff. The British Army's Special Air Service rescued the hostages six days later.

PC Keith Palmer, who was murdered in the line of duty in a terrorist stabbing attack in 2017 in New Palace Yard, was a member of PaDP.

== Crimes by officers ==
=== Wayne Couzens ===
In early 2021, PC Wayne Couzens, who then served with PaDP, used his warrant card to arrest Sarah Everard under the pretence of her having breached the COVID-19 regulations then in effect. He then drove her to the outskirts of Dover where he raped her and then strangled her with his police duty belt. He later burned and disposed of her remains in a pond in Great Chart. Couzens received a whole life order (meaning that he will serve his life sentence without the possibility of parole) for the murder, with the judge explaining that the case was especially serious given the breach of trust involved.

Separately, on 18 March 2022, Wayne Couzens was additionally charged with four counts of indecent exposure related to alleged incidents in January and February 2021, which the Independent Office for Police Conduct had previously determined were inadequately investigated by police.

=== David Carrick ===
Three days after Couzens was jailed, PC David Carrick, a serving member of PaDP was charged with one count of rape following an alleged attack on a woman on the night of 4 September 2021. On 24 November 2021 and 10 January 2022, he was subsequently charged with a further dozen counts of rape (and sixteen of related offences) alleged to have occurred between 2009 and 2018 against seven other women. On 17 March 2022, Carrick was charged with a further twelve offences, some related to new complainants, that allegedly took place between 2003 and 2015. In November 2022, Carrick had an additional nine sex offence charges added to the 44 he was already facing, bringing the total of alleged offences to 21 counts of rape, nine counts of sexual assault, five counts of assault by penetration, three counts of coercive and controlling behaviour, two counts of false imprisonment, two counts of attempted rape, one count of attempted sexual assault by penetration, and a further count of causing a person to engage in sexual activity without consent. On 16 January 2023, while appearing at Southwark Crown Court, Carrick pleaded guilty to 49 offences against 12 women, including 24 counts of rape, which were committed between 2003 and 2020.

=== Phil Hunter ===
In August 2024, former PaDP officer Phil Hunter faced a disciplinary hearing for allegedly grooming women who had reported crimes to him. A BBC News report states "A former Metropolitan Police officer has been accused of 'a pattern of sexually predatory behaviour' for grooming two vulnerable women he met while on duty." Yet Hunter did not take any action on the crime reports. Instead, Hunter sought to build sexual relationships with the women.

== See also ==
- United States Capitol Police
