= Counter Terrorism Command =

Special unit of the London Metropolitan Police Service

- Active: 2 October 2006 – present
- Agency: Metropolitan Police
- Operations jurisdiction: London; City of London
- Headquarters: New Scotland Yard, Victoria Embankment, London SW1A 2JL
- Abbreviation: CTC; SO15

Counter Terrorism Command (CTC) or SO15 is a Specialist Operations branch within London's Metropolitan Police Service and the City of London Police. The CTC was established as a result of the merging of the Anti-Terrorist Branch (SO13) and Special Branch (SO12) in October 2006, bringing together intelligence, operations, and investigative functions to form a single command. The CTC has more than 1,500 police officers and staff, including a number of investigators based overseas, and also hosts the Counter Terrorism Policing headquarters.

It originated in 1883 as the Irish Bureau, or Special Irish Branch as it became known, formed in 1883 at New Scotland Yard by the then Home Secretary, Sir William Harcourt. It consisted of just 12 detectives aiming to defeat the "Fenian" terrorist campaign that had been ongoing in London and across the country. By November 2013, the form of the CTC had grown to comprise 1,790 staff including 1,350 police officers and 600 detectives working in 75 specialist units with the capability to respond proactively or reactively anywhere in the world.

== Responsibilities ==
According to the CTC's website, the Command's overriding priority is to keep the public safe and to disrupt terrorist-related activity in the United Kingdom and against UK interests overseas by:

- detecting, investigating, and preventing terrorist threats and networks;
- working with partner agencies to acquire and use intelligence and evidence about terrorism and extremism;
- ensuring that the CTC's activity is focused, delivering value for money, productivity and an efficient and effective use of our resources;
- engaging, building and maintaining working relationships with boroughs, local communities, and national and international partners to understand better their needs and to use their expertise and experience in jointly combating the terrorist threat;
- working with communities, partners, institutions, groups and other agencies providing advice and support to tackle the ideologies that drive terrorism and extremism; and
- supporting, working and collaborating within the Counter Terrorism Policing network.

The CTC has a number of other national security functions. It deals with sensitive national security investigations, such as Official Secrets Act enquiries; and the investigation of war crimes (in effect making it the successor to the Met's War Crimes Unit), crimes against humanity, and politically motivated murders.

The CTC is part of the Counter Terrorism Policing network. It is overseen by the counter-terrorism coordination committee, chaired by Assistant Commissioner Laurence Taylor of the Metropolitan Police Service. As part of its role in the Counter Terrorism Policing network, the CTC operates against the threat of terrorism at a local, national and international level, and engages with a range of partners, including the Security Service (MI5) and Secret Intelligence Service (MI6), to prevent terrorist-related activity.

== Known operations ==
In its present form, the CTC has been responsible for investigating several high-profile terrorist incidents, including:

- the Cargo planes bomb plot or "Printer bomb" (2010);
- the 2017 Westminster attack;
- the Manchester Arena bombing (2017);
- the 2017 London Bridge attack;
- the Poisoning of Sergei and Yulia Skripal (2018);
- the 2018 Amesbury poisonings;
- the 2020 Forbury Gardens stabbings;
- the murder of David Amess (2021); and
- the Liverpool Women's Hospital bombing (2021).

Through the International Operations branch of the CTC, it has deployed officers around the world in response to terrorist incidents in support of host countries and to investigate when British nationals are the victims of acts of terrorism. Such investigations include:

- the kidnap of Judith Tebbutt and the murder of David Tebbutt in Kenya (2012);
- the In Amenas siege (2013);
- the Westgate siege in Nairobi (2013); and
- the Sousse attacks in Tunisia (2015).

== Heads ==
As of December 2025, those directly in charge of Counter Terrorism are Commanders Dom Murphy and James Harman, who ultimately report to Assistant Commissioner Laurence Taylor.

Some former Heads of CTC
No.	Name	Tenure start	Tenure end	Ref
1	Commander Peter Clarke	2006	2008	
2	Commander John McDowall	2008	2011	
3	Commander Richard Walton	2011	2015	
4	Commander Dean Haydon	2015	2018	
—	Acting Commander Clarke Jarrett	2018	2019	
5	Commander Richard Smith	2019	?	

== See also ==
- Counter Terrorism Policing
- Joint Terrorism Analysis Centre
- Metropolitan Police Specialist Firearms Command
- MI5
- MI6
- National Counter Terrorism Security Office
