= Mario Dubsky =

British painter (1939–1985)

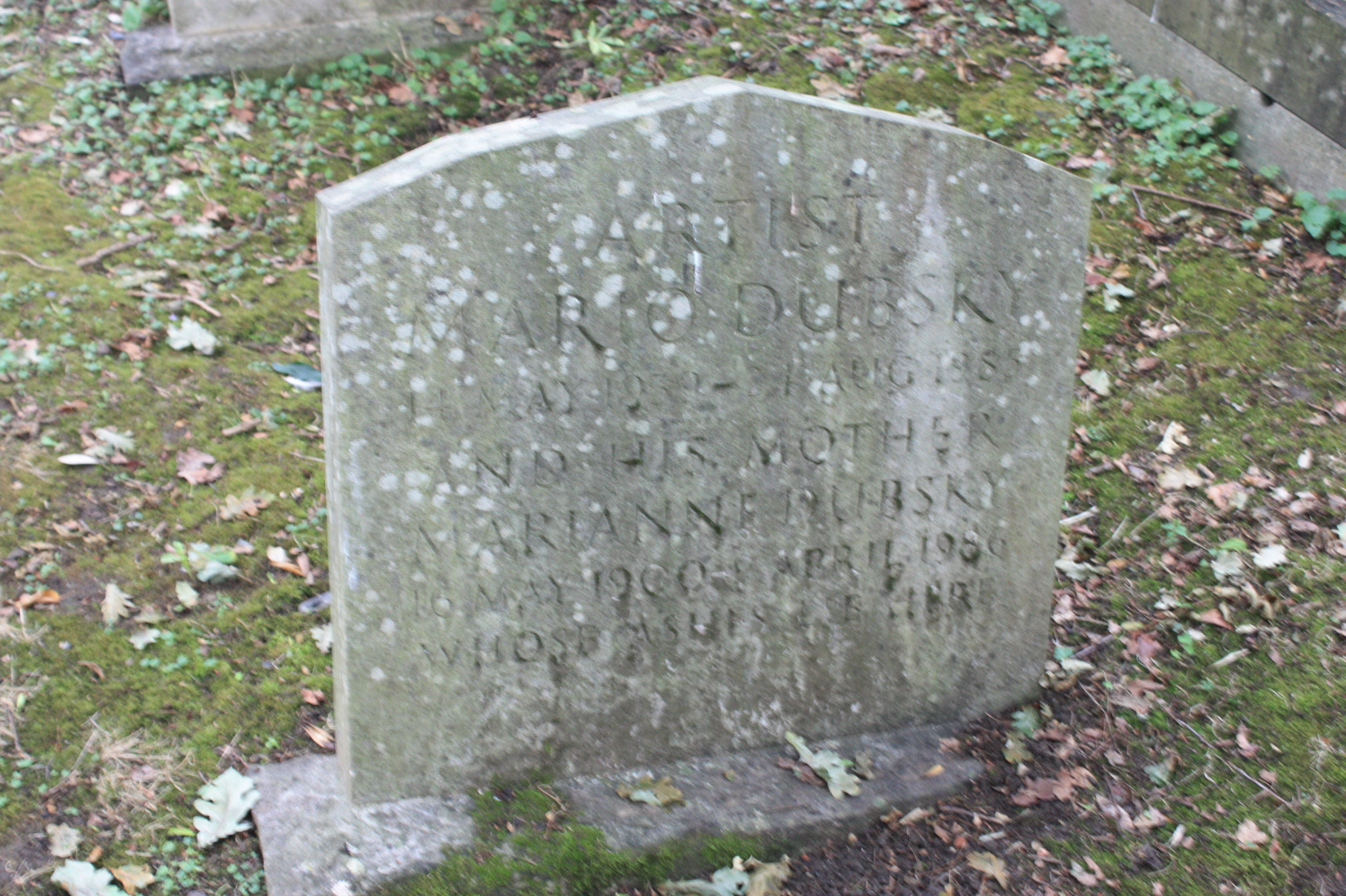
The grave of Mario Dubsky, Highgate Cemetery

Mario Dubsky (1939 – 4 August 1985) was an artist born in London, England, to Viennese Jewish parents who had converted to Christianity.

== Life and career ==
=== Early life ===
Accepted at the Slade School of Fine Art at the unusually young age of 17, Dubsky's early work was influenced by the work of the Anglo-Jewish artist David Bomberg, a Slade School alumnus of 40 years earlier. He purchased early works from Bomberg's widow which he kept all his life. Several tutors were important and lasting influences including Robert Medley and Keith Vaughan, the latter becoming a close friend.

Selected for the Arts Council Young Contemporaries touring show in 1959 he wrote of his approach to painting "... for when is painting natural? It is a willed effort that I believe must be sustained wholeheartedly and uncompromisingly...". Dubsky was included in the New Generation show at the Whitechapel Gallery in 1966 and 1968.

Awarded a Harkness Fellowship he traveled to New York, where he lived from 1969 until 1971. In New York, Dubsky and John Button co-created a large mural in paint and collage at the then-headquarters of the Gay Activists Alliance. The mural was lost in the arson attack that destroyed the building.

=== Later career ===
In the late 1960s, Dubsky developed a more abstract colour field manner of painting with figuration, as in the large-scale Laocconese of 1968 at University College London, named after the classical sculpture, the Laocoön Group.

From the 1970s, Dubsky liked to sketch prehistoric bone and skeleton forms at the Natural History Museum and returned to expressionist figuration. His last solo exhibition, X Factor at South London Gallery in 1983, contained "Cabaret Valhalla", now held by the Tate Gallery. His poems and illustrations in Tom Pilgrim's Progress Among The Consequences of Christianity, London, 1981, with an introduction by Edward Lucie-Smith, was claimed by the artist, who was an atheist, as his angry response to the 1977 Blasphemy Trial of Gay News. The inside covers reproduce the Gay Alliance mural made with Button and figures within explicitly engage with crucifixes and resemble monk-like characters.

Dubsky died on 4 August 1985, following a period of illness caused by HIV infection. shortly after winning the Tolly Cobbold Drawing Prize with "Roma II". He was buried following a humanist service in the eastern section of Highgate Cemetery alongside the main west path.

His younger sister Barbara helped ensure a number of posthumous exhibitions and Dubsky's work is held in a number of public collections.
