= Child abuse investigation team =

A Child Abuse Investigation Team/Unit (CAIT) is a unit within a police force in the United Kingdom, responsible for investigating offences relating to minors.

== Metropolitan Police ==
The Metropolitan Police first established specialist Child Protection Teams in 1988. Prior to this, allegations of child sexual abuse had been investigated by the local CID. The establishment was contemporary to wider reforms in child protection resulting from Baroness Butler-Sloss' inquiry into the Cleveland child abuse scandal, and the introduction of the Children Act 1989.

Child Protection Teams were based on local Borough Operational Command Units. Around 2000, these teams merged to create "Specialist Operations 5" (SO5, later SCD5). Child Abuse Investigation Teams were formed on local BOCUs around 2003. SCD5 was merged with SCD2 (Rape and Serious Sexual Assaults Command) in 2014/15 to form SCO17 (Sexual Offences, Exploitation and Child Abuse Command), then split off to create the Child Abuse and Sexual Offences command (CASO) in 2016.

Between 2018 and 2019, the Metropolitan Police underwent a broad reorganisation, merging multiple 32 BOCUs in to 12 Basic Command Units (BCU). As part of this, the central CASO command was merged into the local Child Abuse Investigation Teams, which became part of individual BCUs Safeguarding Strands.
