= Specialist Operations =

Unit of the Metropolitan Police in England

The Specialist Operations directorate is a unit of the Metropolitan Police in London, England. It is responsible for providing specialist policing capabilities, including national security and counter-terrorism operations. As of August 2025, the Specialist Operations directorate is led by Assistant Commissioner Laurence Taylor.

== History ==
It was formed on 11 March 1985 by Commissioner Kenneth Newman. At its peak, Specialist Operations (SO) was a group of twenty specialist units, which were formed to give the Metropolitan Police a specialist policing capability. The SO designation was implemented in 1985 as part of Sir Kenneth Newman's restructuring of the Metropolitan Police Service. Most of the units designated SO units were already in existence, many of them as branches within C Department of New Scotland Yard, and all were presided over by an Assistant Commissioner of Special Operations (ACSO).

In 1999, its Organised Crime Group took over residual work from the disbanded War Crimes Unit.

In 2010, ACSO co-directed Operation Guava, aimed at "a significant terrorist plot". The aim of this ACSO action was to prevent the establishment of a jihadist training camp in Kashmir on land owned by one of the suspects. Operation Guava resulted in the 2012 conviction of Usman Khan, who went on to perpetrate the 2019 London Bridge stabbing.

== Structure ==
=== 1985–2015 ===
==== Protection Command ====
Until April 2015, the Protection Command was split into three units that provided protection for ministers, for the royal family, and for foreign embassies, diplomats, and visiting dignitaries:

Specialist Protection (SO1)
Provided armed personal protection services for ministers and public officials at threat from terrorism, including visiting heads of government and other public figures. In April 2015, it was merged with Royalty Protection to form Royalty and Specialist Protection (RaSP).
Royalty Protection (SO14)
Provided protection for the monarch and other members of the Royal Family. The Operational Command Unit (OCU) was divided into Residential Protection, Personal and Close Protection, and the Special Escort Group (SEG) that provided mobile protection. In April 2015, it was merged with Specialist Protection to form Royalty and Specialist Protection (RaSP).
Diplomatic Protection Group (SO16)
Provided protection for foreign missions in London, including protecting embassies and the residences of visiting heads of state, heads of government and ministers. In April 2015, it was merged with the Palace of Westminster Division to form Parliamentary and Diplomatic Protection (PaDP).

==== Security Command ====
Until April 2015, the Security Command consisted of three units that provided protection for Parliament, for the two airports within Greater London (Heathrow Airport and London City Airport), and for major events in London.

Palace of Westminster Division (SO17)
Was responsible for the protection of the Houses of Parliament and consisted of a team of 500 people. Officers were unarmed. In April 2015, it was merged with the Diplomatic Protection Group to form Parliamentary and Diplomatic Protection (PaDP).
Aviation Security Operational Command Unit (SO18)
Became Aviation Policing (SOAP).
Counter Terrorism Protective Security Command (SO20)
Remains unchanged.

==== Counter Terrorism Command ====
This was formed by the merger in October 2006 of the Anti-Terrorist Branch (SO13) and Special Branch (SO12), both already within Specialist Operations. It has remained structurally unchanged since that date.

=== Since April 2015 ===
The Specialist Operations Directorate comprises three commands.

==== Protection Command ====
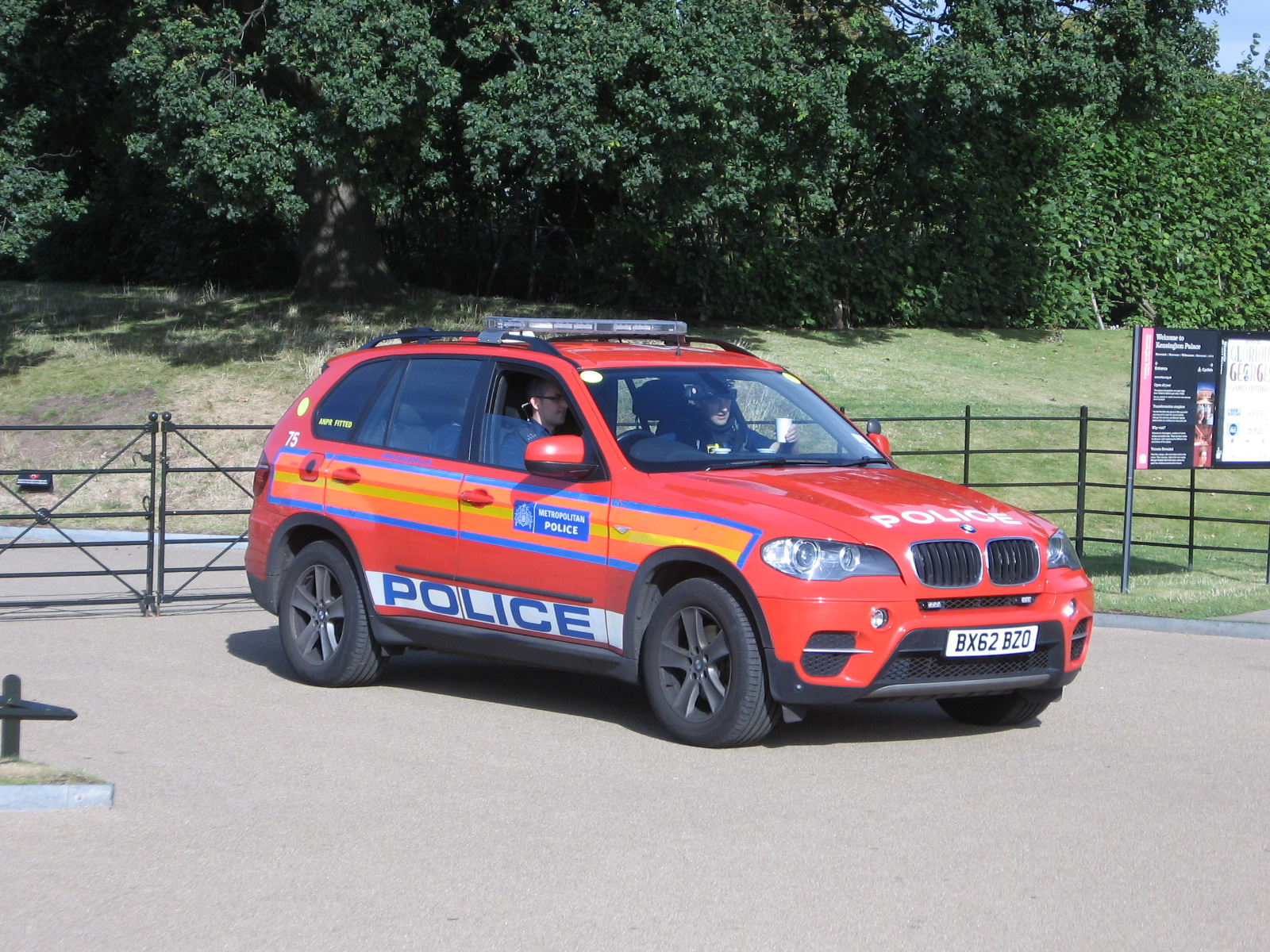
Protection Command response vehicle near Kensington Palace

The Protection Command is led by a commander overseen by a deputy assistant commissioner. The command is responsible for protective security for high-profile governmental representatives of the United Kingdom or from the diplomatic community. As such, it is analogous to the United States Secret Service or the Diplomatic Security Service. The command comprises two branches:

- Royalty and Specialist Protection (RaSP) provides personal protection for the royal family, the prime minister, government ministers, ambassadors, visiting heads of state and other individuals deemed to be at risk. RaSP also provide armed security at royal residences in London, Windsor, and Scotland. The Special Escort Group (SEG) is also operated by Special Operations.
- Parliamentary and Diplomatic Protection (PaDP) provides armed protection of embassies, missions and the Parliamentary Estate. They also provide residential protection for high-profile government ministers and are responsible for access control and security at Downing Street and New Scotland Yard. PaDP was formed in April 2015, with the merger of the Diplomatic Protection Group (SO16, formerly SO6) and the Palaces of Westminster Command (SO17).

==== Security Command ====
The Security Command is led by a commander and overseen by the same deputy assistant commissioner as the Protection Command. The command comprises two branches:

- Aviation Policing (SOAP - SO18) provides armed policing and security for all passengers and staff travelling through Heathrow and London City Airport. Gatwick, Stansted and Luton are policed by Sussex, Essex and Bedfordshire Police respectively, as they are not located in the Metropolitan Police area.
- Counter Terrorism Protective Security Operations (CTPSO - SO20) continues to provide counter-unmanned aerial system capabilities and other security measures to prevent terrorism across London.

==== Counter Terrorism Command ====
The Counter Terrorism Command (CTC) is led by a commander overseen by a deputy assistant commissioner. The deputy assistant commissioner is the concurrent National Police Chiefs' Council Senior National Coordinator for Counter Terrorism Policing leading the network. The Counter Terrorism Command (SO15) is responsible for protecting London and the rest of the United Kingdom from the threat of terrorism. The command operates against the threat of terrorism at a local, national and international level, and supports the national Counter Terrorism Policing network (the regional counter terrorism units and the National Police Chiefs' Council). The Command also has the national lead for domestic extremism in support of the National Domestic Extremism and Disorder Intelligence Unit. The command also deals with sensitive national security investigations, such as Official Secrets Act enquiries, the investigation of war crimes and crimes against humanity, and politically motivated murders. It was created in 2006 through the merger of the Met's Anti-Terrorist Branch and Special Branch.

== Historical structure ==
Owing to continual restructuring of the Metropolitan Police, only a few of the original SO units still exist in their original form and still use the SO designation. Where the SO designation has been reassigned to another unit, the units are listed in order

- SO1 – Originally Major Investigations (merged into other SO units). Later Specialist Protection (now within the Protection Command)
- SO2 – Crime Support Branch/Department Support Group
- SO3 – Scenes of Crime Branch/Directorate of Forensic Services (now part of the Specialist Crime Directorate as SCD4 Forensic Services)
- SO4 – National Identification Service
- SO5 – Miscellaneous Force Indexes/Child Protection (now SCD5 Child Abuse Investigation Team)
- SO6 – Fraud Squad (now SCD6 Economic and Specialist Crime)
- SO7 – Serious and Organised Crime, Flying Squad (renamed to Serious and Organised Crime Group, SCD7)
- SO8 – Forensic Science Laboratory
- SO9 – No.9 Regional Crime Squad
- SO10 – Crime Operations Group (now SCD10 Covert Policing)
- SO11 – Criminal Intelligence Branch (renamed to Public Order Operational Command Unit, CO11)
- SO12 – Special Branch (merged with SO13 to create SO15 Counter Terrorism Command)
- SO13 – Anti-Terrorism Branch (merged with SO12)
- SO14 – Royalty Protection Branch (now within the Protection Command)
- SO15 – Originally the Royal Palaces Division (merged into SO14). Now Counter Terrorism Command
- SO16 – Diplomatic Protection Group (now within the Protection Command)
- SO17 – Originally the Palace of Westminster Division, later PNC Bureau (now the Police Information Technology Organisation)
- SO18 – Aviation Security/Airport Policing (now Aviation Security within Security Command)
- SO19 – Force Firearms Unit (Specialist Firearms Command, now within Met Operations)
- SO20 – Forensic Medical Examiners Branch

== See also ==
- Central Operations
- Law enforcement in the United Kingdom
- Territorial Operations
