= Keith Palmer (police officer) =

London police officer

Constable Keith Palmer GM
- Born: Keith David Palmer; 3 October 1968
- Died: 22 March 2017 (aged 48); New Palace Yard, Palace of Westminster, London, England
- Police career
- Country: United Kingdom
- Department: Metropolitan Police Service
- Service years: 2001–2017
- Rank: Police Constable
- Badge no.: 4157U (–2015); 2185SO (2015–17)
- Awards: George Medal (posthumously)
- Cause of death: Stab wounds

Keith David Palmer GM (3 October 1968 – 22 March 2017) was a British police officer who was posthumously awarded the George Medal, the second-highest award for gallantry "not in the face of the enemy". Though unarmed, he stopped Khalid Masood, a knife-wielding terrorist from entering the Palace of Westminster during the 2017 Westminster attack; he was fatally wounded in the attack. He had worked for the Metropolitan Police Service (MPS) for 16 years, and had joined the force's Parliamentary and Diplomatic Protection Group in April 2016.

== Police career ==
Palmer had served in the British Army as a Bombardier with the Royal Artillery until August 2001 when he was discharged. In November 2001, Palmer joined the Metropolitan Police as a police constable (PC). From 2002 to 2009, he served in the London Borough of Bromley. He then joined the Territorial Support Group, a grouping that specialises in public order and operates across Greater London. In 2015, he was nominated as "best thief taker" at the Commissioner's Excellence Awards in recognition of making 150 arrests in twelve months. In April 2016, he joined the MPS's Parliamentary and Diplomatic Protection Group.

=== Westminster attack ===
On 22 March 2017, Palmer was in New Palace Yard guarding the Palace of Westminster. He was unarmed. At approximately 14:40, he was approached by Khalid Masood, who was armed with two knives. Though unarmed, Palmer confronted Masood in an attempt to stop him. Masood fatally injured Palmer during this encounter. By confronting Masood, Palmer delayed him long enough for his armed colleagues to arrive and shoot Masood dead. A Member of Parliament, Tobias Ellwood, performed cardiopulmonary resuscitation on Palmer until emergency medical staff arrived, but Palmer was pronounced dead at the scene.

== Funeral ==
Palmer's funeral

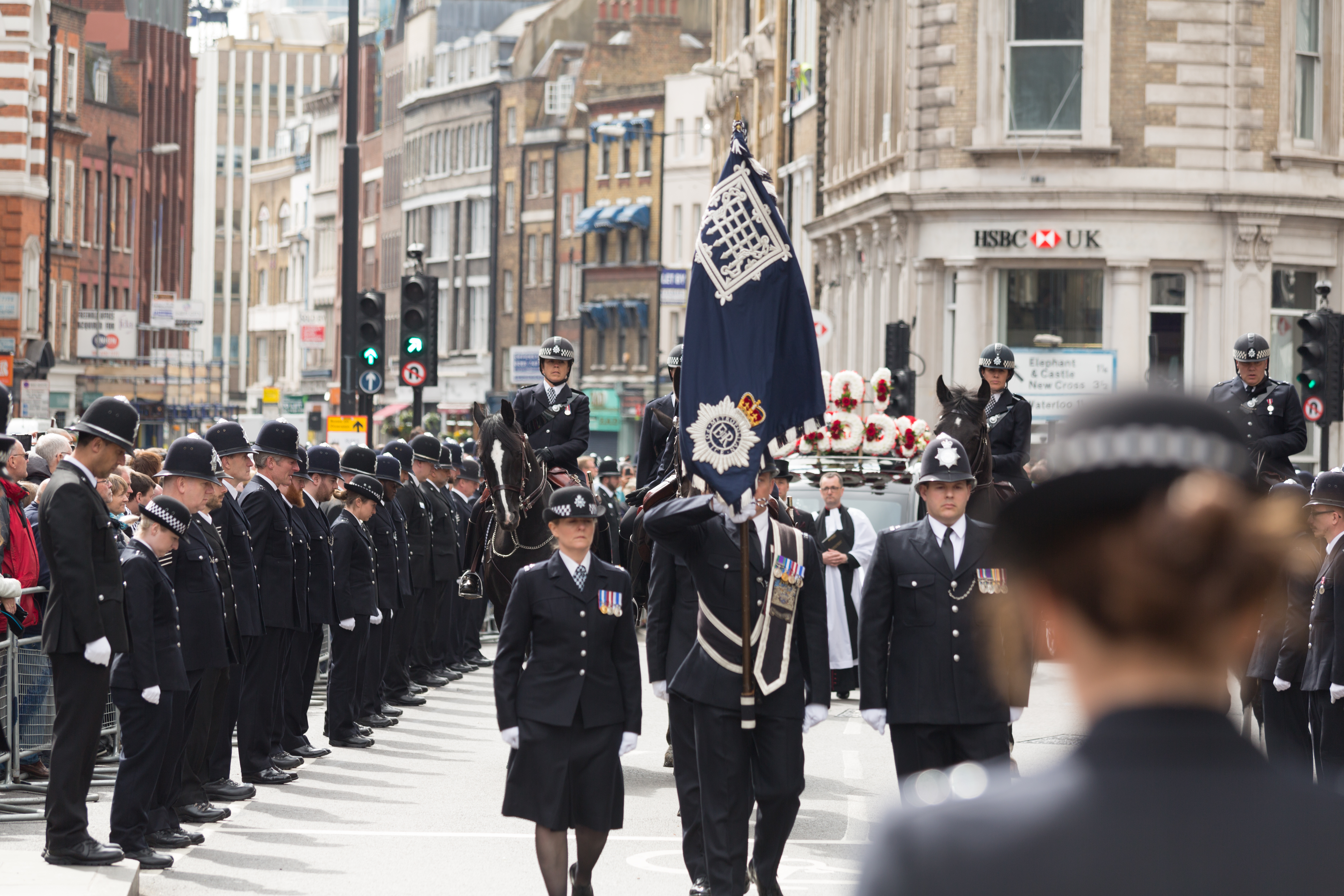
The front of the funeral procession

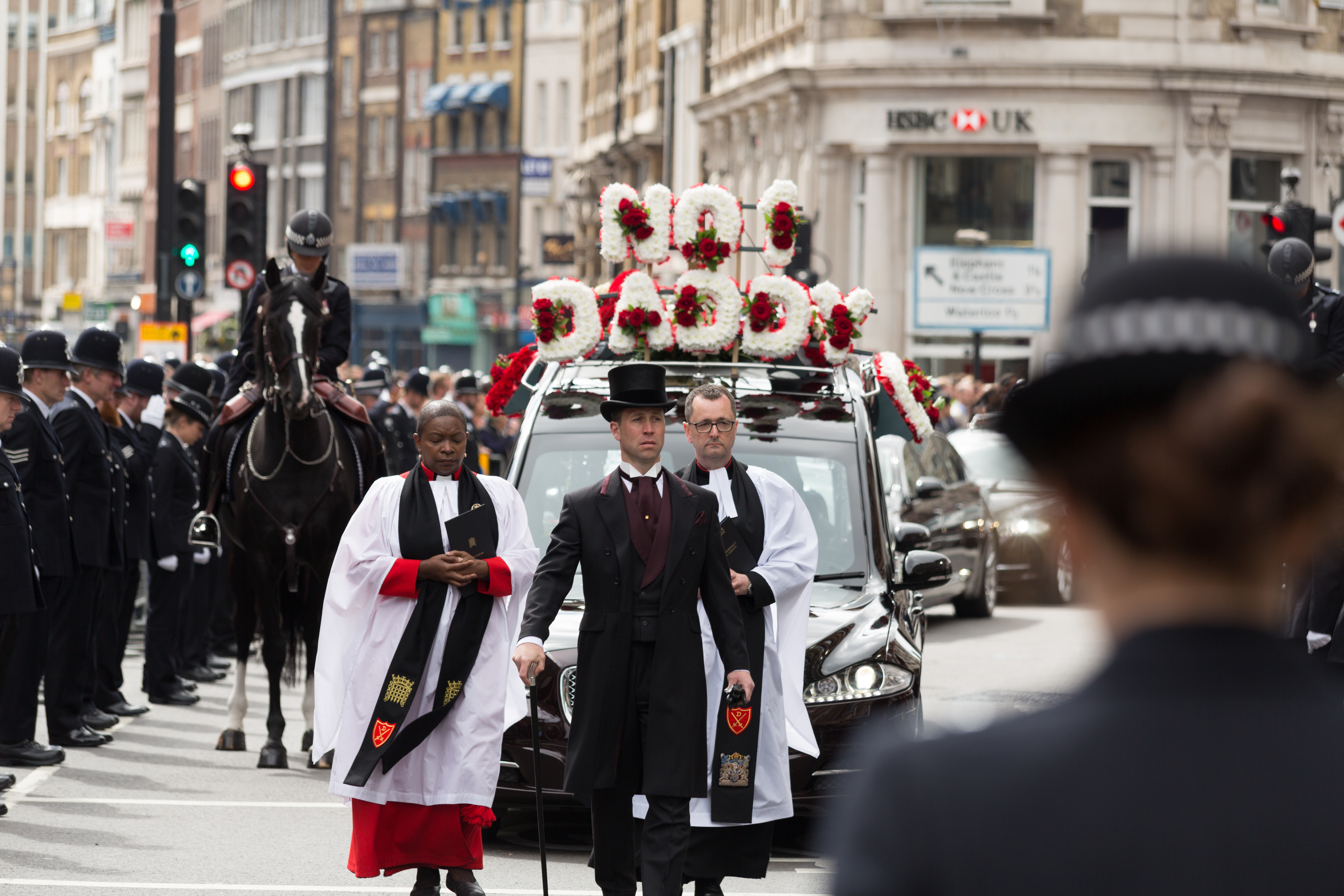
The hearse carrying Palmer's coffin with 'No 1 Daddy' floral decoration

Palmer was granted the rare honour of lying in rest in the Chapel of St Mary Undercroft, Palace of Westminster; other recipients of this honour include: the former Prime Minister Margaret Thatcher in 2013 and the former Postmaster General Tony Benn in 2014. On 9 April 2017, his coffin was received into the chapel with a guard of honour of police officers. A private service was then held for his family. Officers kept vigil next to the coffin overnight.

Memorials to Palmer

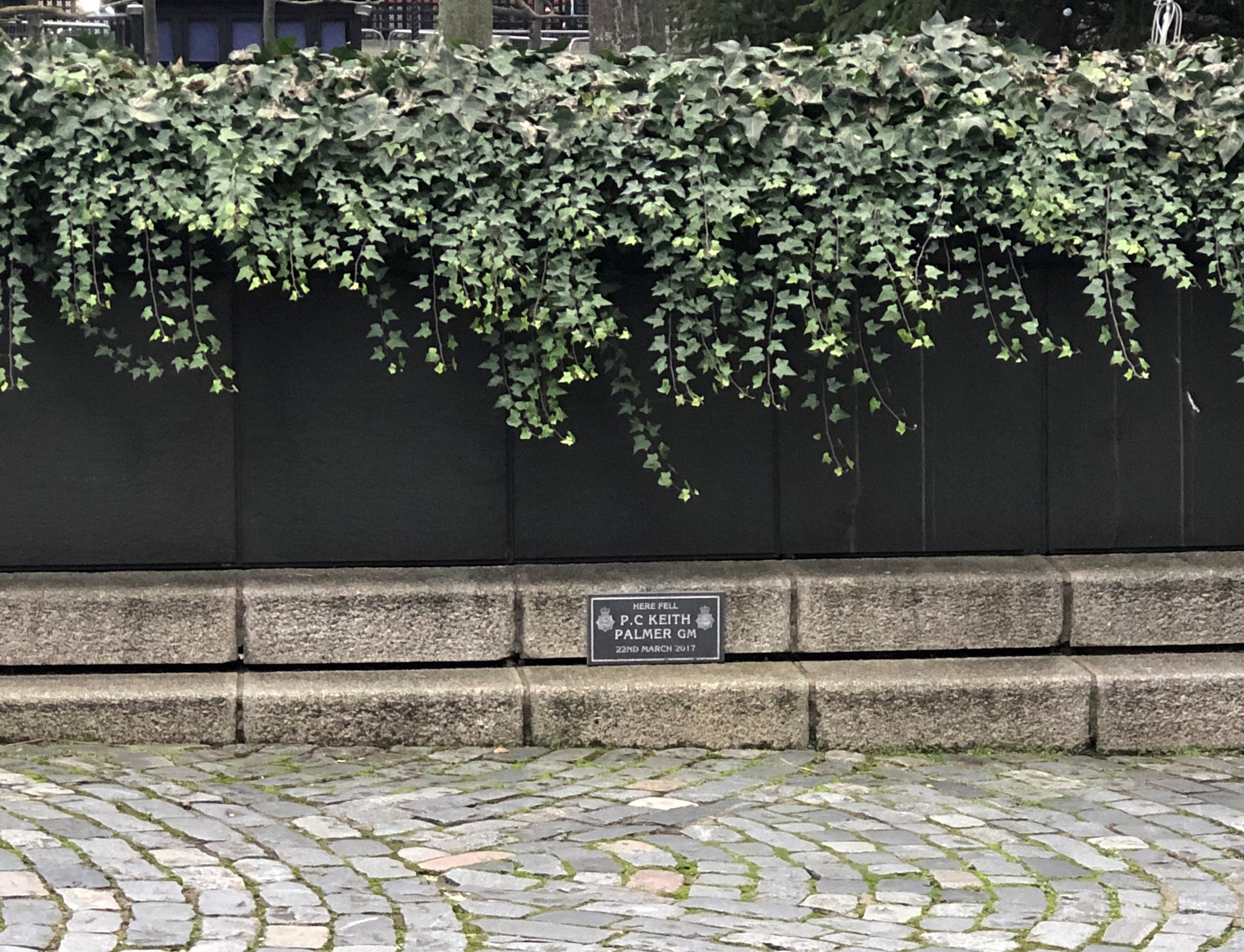
Plaque to Palmer in New Palace Yard

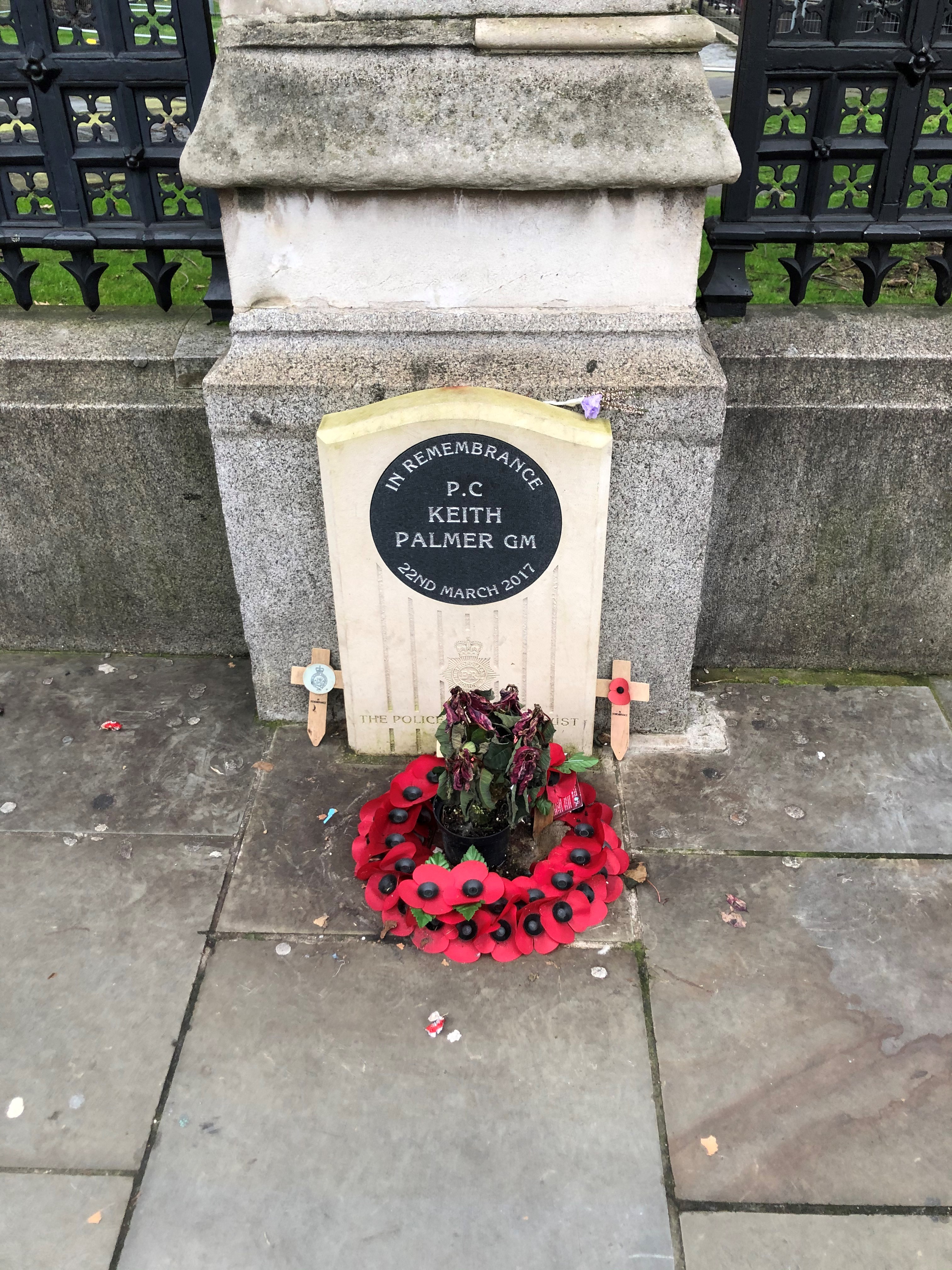
Memorial to Palmer on Parliament Square

The following day, on 10 April, Palmer's coffin travelled in procession to Southwark Cathedral, escorted by motorcycle outriders from the Special Escort Group of the Metropolitan Police. The route was 2.6 miles (4.2 km) long and avoided Westminster Bridge where the terrorist attack had begun. Instead, the procession crossed the Thames over Lambeth Bridge, during which a ten-second horn salute was given by boats on the river. Tens of thousands of people lined the streets, including 5,000 police officers. The procession was fronted by a colour party carrying the Metropolitan Police Service Standard, who were followed by five mounted police officers. Then came the funeral conductor and chaplains (including Rose Hudson-Wilkin, Chaplain to the Speaker of the House of Commons) who were walking in front of the hearse. The hearse carried Palmer's coffin which was draped in the police flag, and there were "red and white floral tributes atop the hearse"; these "spelled out 'No 1 Daddy', 'husband', 'son', 'brother', 'uncle' and 'Keith'". Making up the rear were cars carrying his family, and four more mounted officers.

Palmer was given a full police funeral at Southwark Cathedral. It was attended by his family and friends, and a number of dignitaries including Cressida Dick, the newly appointed Commissioner of the Metropolitan Police. Dick read the poem "Funeral Blues" by W. H. Auden at the service which was her first public engagement since taking up the post. The address was given by Andrew Nunn, the Dean of Southwark.

== Personal life ==
Palmer and his wife, Michelle, had a daughter together, who was five years old at the time of Keith Palmer's death.

Palmer was a supporter of Charlton Athletic and held a season ticket. The club honoured him by replacing his regular seat at The Valley stadium with "a white chair bearing his warrant number 'P204752'".

== Honours ==
In the 2017 Birthday Honours, Palmer was awarded the George Medal (GM) "for confronting an armed terrorist to protect others and Parliament". In recognition of his sacrifice, the Metropolitan Police Service retired his shoulder number (4157U) and stated that it would "not be reissued to any other officer". His name has been added to the United Kingdom's Police Roll of Honour by the Police Roll of Honour Trust. He was awarded the outstanding bravery of the year award at the 2018 Met Excellence Awards.
