= 2017 Westminster attack =

Terrorist attack in London

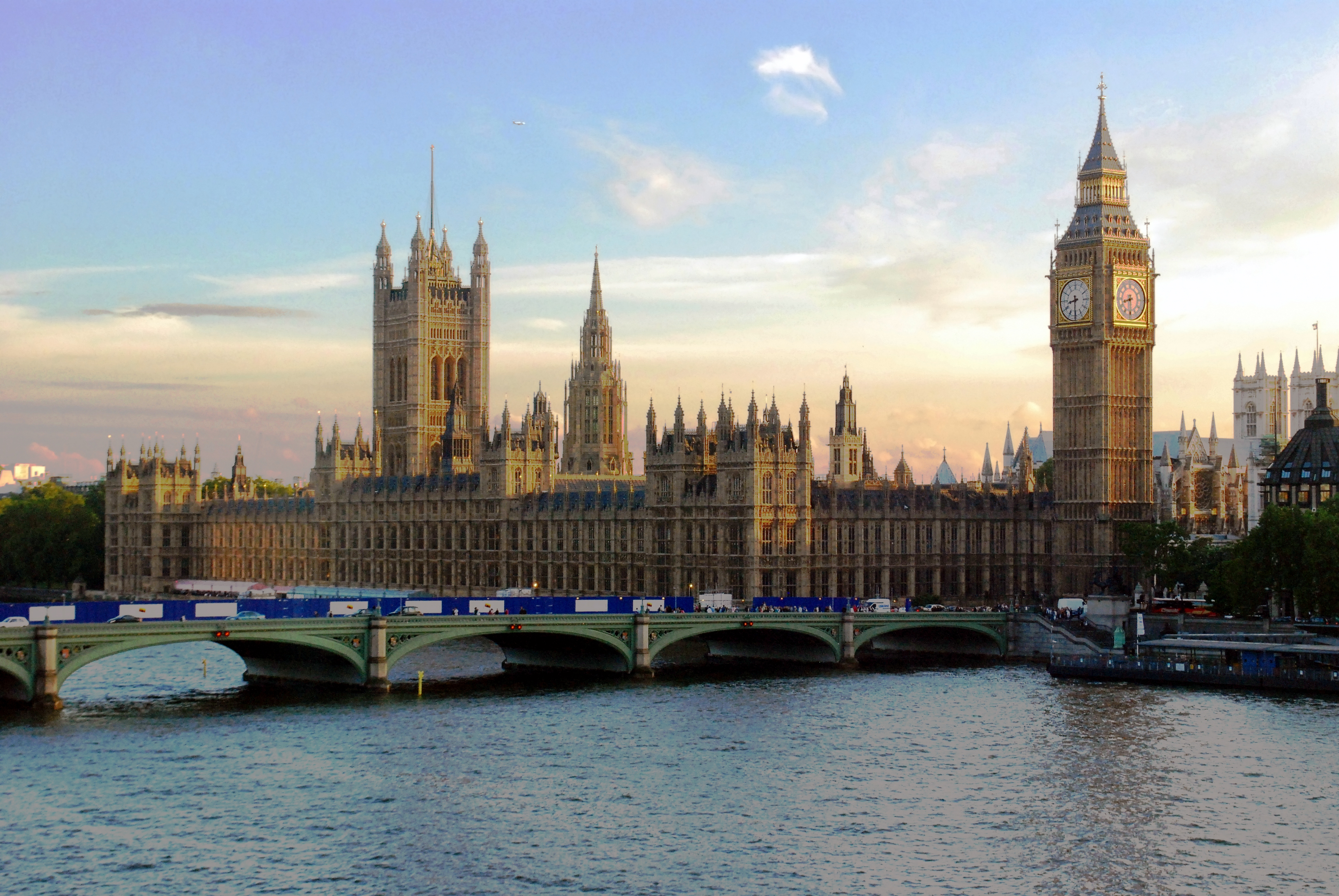
1	Hyundai Tucson mounts Westminster Bridge pavement
2	Vehicle collides with pedestrians, 4 die as a result of injuries including one pedestrian who is thrown off the bridge into River Thames, 48 are injured
3	Vehicle crashes into railings outside New Palace Yard
4	Masood abandons vehicle and enters New Palace Yard
5	Masood attacks PC Palmer and is shot by surrounding officers
- Location: 51°30′03″N 0°07′19″W; Westminster, London, United Kingdom
- Date: 22 March 2017; 9 years ago 14:40 (GMT (UTC))
- Attack type: Vehicle-ramming attack; Stabbing
- Weapons: Hyundai Tucson; Knife
- Deaths: 6 (including the perpetrator)
- Injuries: 48
- Assailant: Khalid Masood
- Motive: Islamic terrorism

On 22 March 2017, a terrorist attack took place outside the Palace of Westminster in London, seat of the British Parliament. Khalid Masood, a 52-year-old Briton, drove a car into pedestrians on the pavement along the south side of Westminster Bridge and Bridge Street, injuring more than 50 people, four of them fatally. He then crashed the car into the perimeter fence of the palace grounds and ran into New Palace Yard, where he fatally stabbed an unarmed police officer. He was then shot by an armed police officer, and died at the scene.

Police treated the attack as "Islamist-related terrorism". Masood said in a final text message that he was waging jihad in revenge for Western military action in Muslim countries in the Middle East. Amaq News Agency, which is linked to the Islamic State, said the attacker answered the group's calls to target citizens of states that were fighting against it, though the claim was questioned by the UK police and government. Police have found no link with a terrorist organisation and believe Masood acted alone.

== Background ==
Prior to the attack, the UK Threat Level for terrorism in the country was listed at "severe", meaning an attack was "highly likely". There had not been a killing at the Palace of Westminster since the assassination of Airey Neave by the Irish National Liberation Army in 1979, which took place close to New Palace Yard, during the Northern Ireland conflict. The previous terrorist attack to have caused multiple casualties on the British mainland had been the 7 July 2005 London bombings. Shortly before the attack, a division had been called in the House of Commons.

== Attack ==
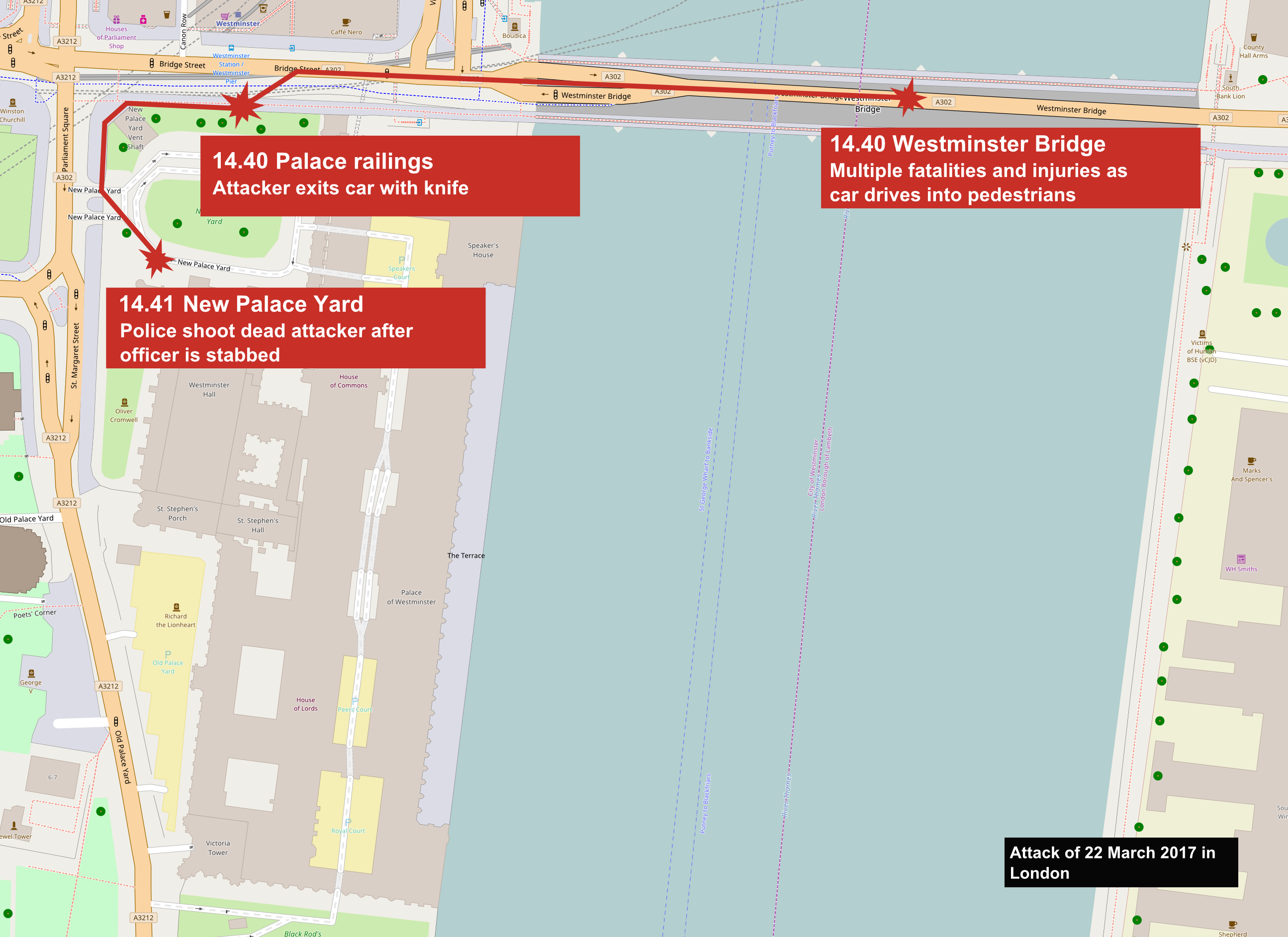
Each stage of the attack and Masood's route through Westminster

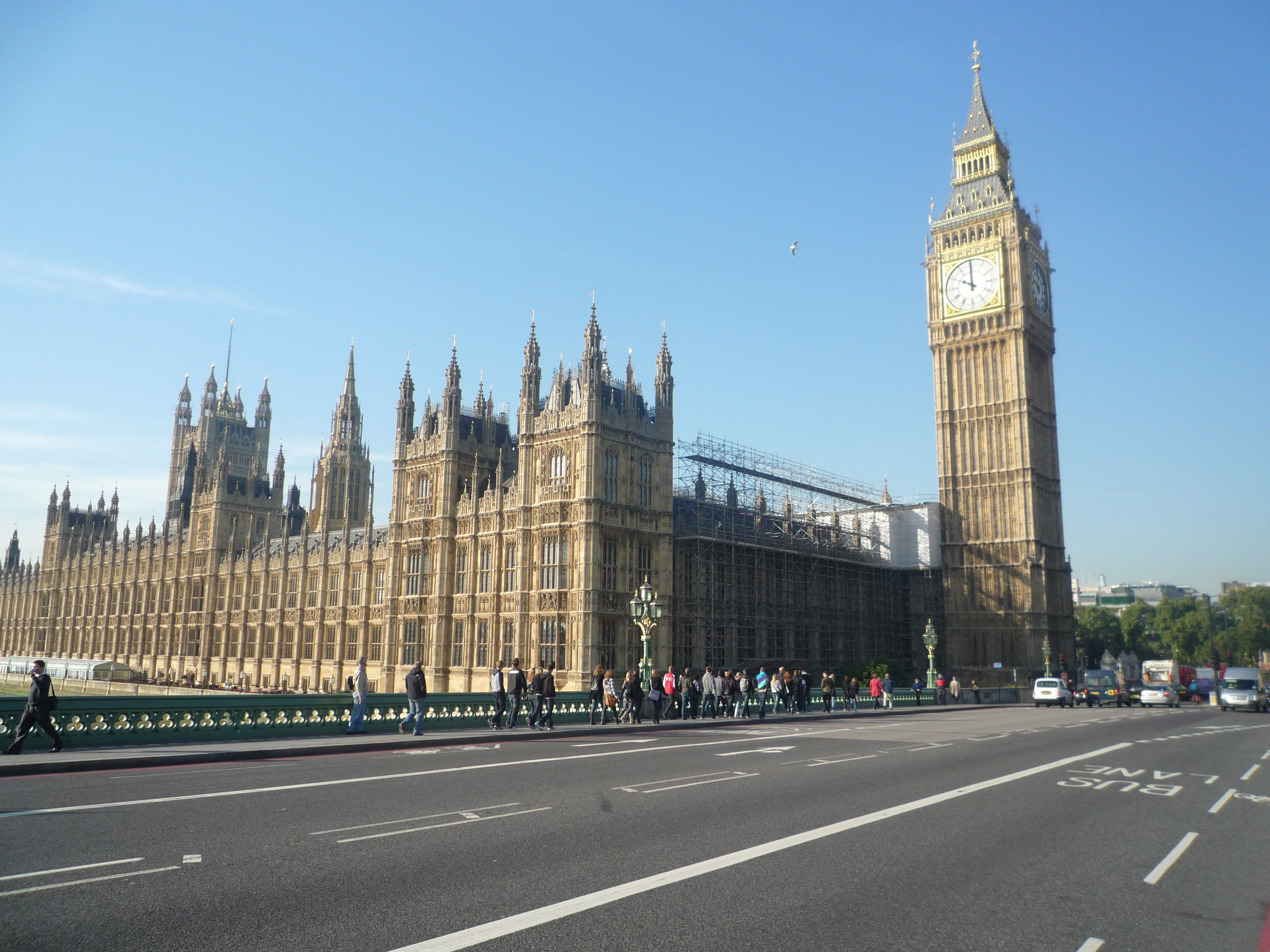
Westminster Bridge, Bridge Street and the Palace of Westminster, the main locations where the attack took place

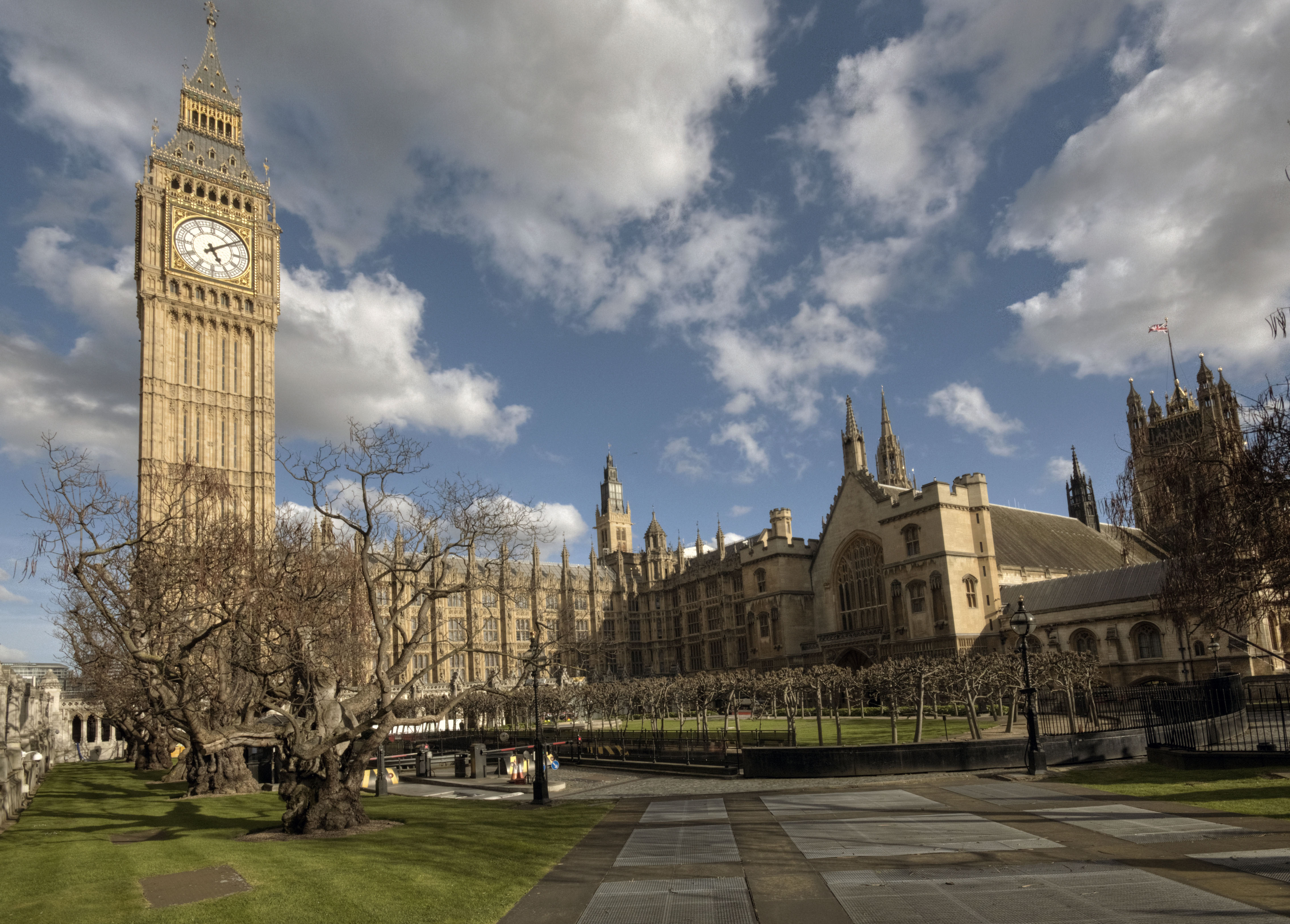
New Palace Yard, where the knife attack and shooting by police took place

At 14:40 local time on 22 March 2017, a grey Hyundai Tucson, hired in Birmingham, was driven at up to 76 miles per hour (122 km/h) into pedestrians along the pavement on the south side of Westminster Bridge and Bridge Street, causing multiple casualties. One of the victims, a Romanian tourist, was thrown by the car's impact over the parapet of the bridge into the River Thames below. Having been knocked unconscious and sustained severe injuries from the fall, she was rescued by the crew of a river cruise and brought aboard a London Fire Brigade boat. She later died in hospital from her injuries.

The car continued, and crashed into railings on Bridge Street at the north perimeter of the Palace of Westminster. Masood, wearing black clothes, got out of the car and ran around the corner into Parliament Square and through the open Carriage Gates where he fatally stabbed an unarmed police officer, PC Keith Palmer. An armed police officer (believed to have been the Metropolitan Police close protection officer for the then Secretary of State for Defence Michael Fallon) witnessed the stabbing, ran towards the scene and shot Masood dead. The entire attack lasted 82 seconds.

Despite attempts to resuscitate him, Masood died at the scene having been hit by all three shots fired by police. The first bullet, which struck his upper torso, was believed to be the cause of death; he was pronounced dead at 15:35 at hospital. Passers-by, including MP Tobias Ellwood (the Foreign Minister for the Middle East and Africa), former boxer Tony Davis and paramedics, attempted to revive PC Palmer, also without success. Police later confirmed that PC Palmer had been wearing a protective vest, which did not appear to have been punctured in the attack.

=== Aftermath ===
Theresa May, the Prime Minister, who was in the Commons for a vote, was evacuated by her security team in the Prime Ministerial car, and taken to 10 Downing Street. Additional armed police officers arrived, including Counter Terrorist Specialist Firearms Officers who were on scene within 6 minutes. An air ambulance from London HEMS attended the scene, landing in Parliament Square. Parliament was suspended and MPs remained in the Commons debating chamber as a precaution. Parliamentary staff were confined to their offices; journalists and visitors to Parliament were not permitted to leave the building. Some were later evacuated to Westminster Abbey.

The Scottish Parliament and the National Assembly for Wales also suspended their proceedings that afternoon. The UK government's emergency Cabinet Office Briefing Room (COBRA) committee, chaired by the Prime Minister, met in response to the attack. It was decided there was no need for the threat level to be raised as a result of the attack.

== Casualties ==
Casualties by nationality
Nationality	Dead	Injured
United Kingdom	3	12
United States	1	1
Romania	1	1
South Korea		4
France		3
Greece		2
Italy		2
Australia		1
China		1
Ireland		1
Poland		1
Portugal		1
Undisclosed		18
Total	5	48

=== Fatalities ===
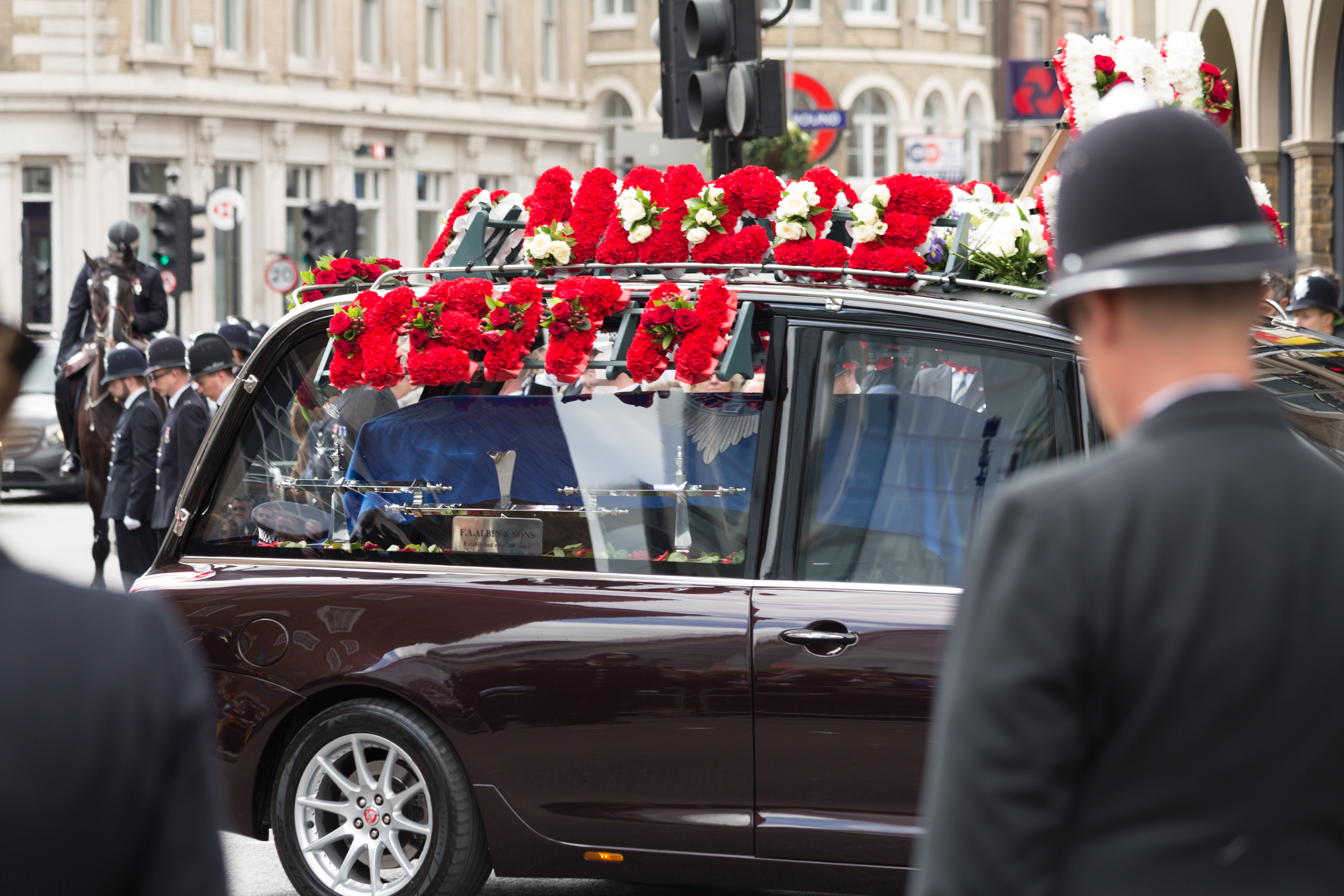
The hearse carrying PC Keith Palmer en route to Southwark Cathedral

Six people, including the attacker, died as a result of the incident, and around 50 others were injured, some of them severely. Of the five people killed by the attacker, three were British nationals. One of the dead was a teacher believed to have been walking along the bridge to pick up her children from school. A tourist from the United States also died; he was visiting London from Utah to celebrate his 25th anniversary with his wife, who was among the injured. The fourth victim was a 75-year-old man from Clapham in south-west London, who was hit by the car and later died in hospital after his life support was switched off. A fifth victim, a 31-year-old tourist from Romania, fell into the Thames during the attack; she died in hospital as a result of her injuries on 6 April after her life support was withdrawn. Her Romanian boyfriend, who had planned to propose marriage during their trip to London, was also injured during the attack.

The police officer killed was PC Keith Palmer, 48, an unarmed police officer who was on duty with the Parliamentary and Diplomatic Protection command. Palmer had 15 years of experience in the Metropolitan Police Service.

=== Injuries ===
A dozen people received serious injuries, some described as "catastrophic", and eight others were treated for less serious injuries at the scene. Injured members of the public were taken to St Thomas' Hospital, which is located immediately across Westminster Bridge in Lambeth, and to King's College Hospital (which declared a 'major incident' in its designated trauma centre), St Mary's Hospital, the Royal London Hospital and the Chelsea and Westminster Hospital. Three French students, from Concarneau in Brittany, were among those injured; others included three police officers who were returning from a commendation ceremony, four students from Edge Hill University in Lancashire, and the wife of the American who was killed.

== Perpetrator ==
The attacker was identified by the Metropolitan Police as Khalid Masood, a 52-year-old Black Briton. He was born Adrian Russell Elms to a single mother but used his stepfather's surname, Ajao, interchangeably with Elms from the age of two. He changed his name to Khalid Masood after converting to Islam. Police said he also used several other aliases, including Khalid Choudry.

Masood was born in Kent, and brought up in Rye, East Sussex, and later attended secondary school in Tunbridge Wells in Kent. Latterly, he lived in the West Midlands. He dropped out of school at 16 and by 18 was described as a heavy cocaine user. He was sentenced to two years in prison in 2000 for grievous bodily harm during a knife attack in a public house in Northiam in Sussex. In 2003, he was sentenced to six months in prison for possession of an offensive weapon following another knife attack in Eastbourne in Sussex. He also had convictions for public order offences going back to 1983. He converted to Islam while in prison although police found no evidence to suggest he became radicalised there. He changed his name to Khalid Masood in 2005.

Masood taught English in Saudi Arabia from November 2005 to November 2006, and again from April 2008 to April 2009, after which he worked at a college teaching English as a foreign language in Luton. In early March 2015, he made a brief trip to Saudi Arabia on an Umrah visa, normally issued to those making a pilgrimage to Mecca.

In 2010, Masood was described as a "peripheral figure" in a MI5 investigation of a group of Islamists later convicted of plotting to bomb a Territorial Army base in Luton. Following a risk assessment, MI5 decided he did not pose a threat. The Metropolitan Police said he was not the subject of any current investigations and there was no prior intelligence about his intent to mount a terrorist attack. He had not been convicted of any terrorism offences.

Farasat Latif, director of the language school in Luton where Masood taught between 2010 and 2012, told The Guardian that when Masood lived in Luton he was apolitical and not aligned with the younger and predominantly Asian local radical Islamist group Al-Muhajiroun. Although aware of violence in Masood's past, Latif had only seen him become angry once, when Masood learnt of plans for a march by the English Defence League through Luton. Between 2012 and 2016, Masood appeared in MI5 investigations as a contact of individuals linked to Al-Muhajiroun.

Masood carried out reconnaissance of Westminster Bridge in person and online three days before the attack, He spent the night before the attack at the Preston Park Hotel in Brighton, Sussex and was described as "laughing and joking" by the manager there. He had taken anabolic steroids in the days and hours before the attack.

Masood, at 52, was atypical in that most jihadi terrorists are under 35.

=== Motive ===
The first media and public briefing from the Metropolitan Police Service, provided by Commander Ben-Julian Harrington at New Scotland Yard following the attack

On 22 March, the day of the attack, the Metropolitan Police said it believed the attack was inspired by "international terrorism" and that they were working under the assumption that it was "Islamist-related terrorism". On 23 March, the Islamic State-associated Amaq News Agency announced that the attacker was "a soldier of the Islamic State, executing the operation in response to calls to target citizens of coalition nations". The Home Secretary, Amber Rudd, cast doubts on this claim. Analysts monitoring Islamic State online said the claim appeared to be an effort to mask its losses in Iraq and Syria, adding that the lack of biographical information on the attacker and lack of specifics about the attack suggested it was not directly involved.

Describing Masood as a "terrorist", the Metropolitan Police said it was investigating whether he was a lone actor inspired by terrorist propaganda or was being directed by others. On 25 March, Neil Basu, Deputy Assistant Commissioner of the Metropolitan Police and Senior National Coordinator for UK Counter-Terrorism Policing, announced that investigators believed Masood acted alone. On 27 March, Basu announced that Masood clearly had an interest in jihad, that his methods echoed the rhetoric of Islamic State leaders and that investigators have found no evidence he was linked with it or al-Qaeda.

The security services later recovered the last WhatsApp message sent by Masood shortly before his attack. In it, Masood reportedly said he was waging jihad in revenge for Western military action in Muslim countries of the Middle East. He had written a document named "Jihad in the Quran and Sunnah", with his photograph on the front page and multiple extracts from the Quran that could be seen as supportive of jihad and martyrdom. He sent this document to numerous contacts a few minutes before the attack.

=== Initial reports ===
Some early reports gave descriptions of two supposed attackers, one described as a "bald white man" and another as a "black man with goatee beard". On the morning after the attack, Mark Rowley, the Metropolitan Police's Assistant Commissioner for Specialist Operations, stated that the police believed the attacker acted alone. Abu Izzadeen was also erroneously identified as the attacker on social media, Channel 4 News and The Independent shortly after the attack, although Izzadeen was actually in prison at the time. In April 2017, OFCOM announced an investigation into the Channel 4 News naming of Izzadeen.

== Investigation ==
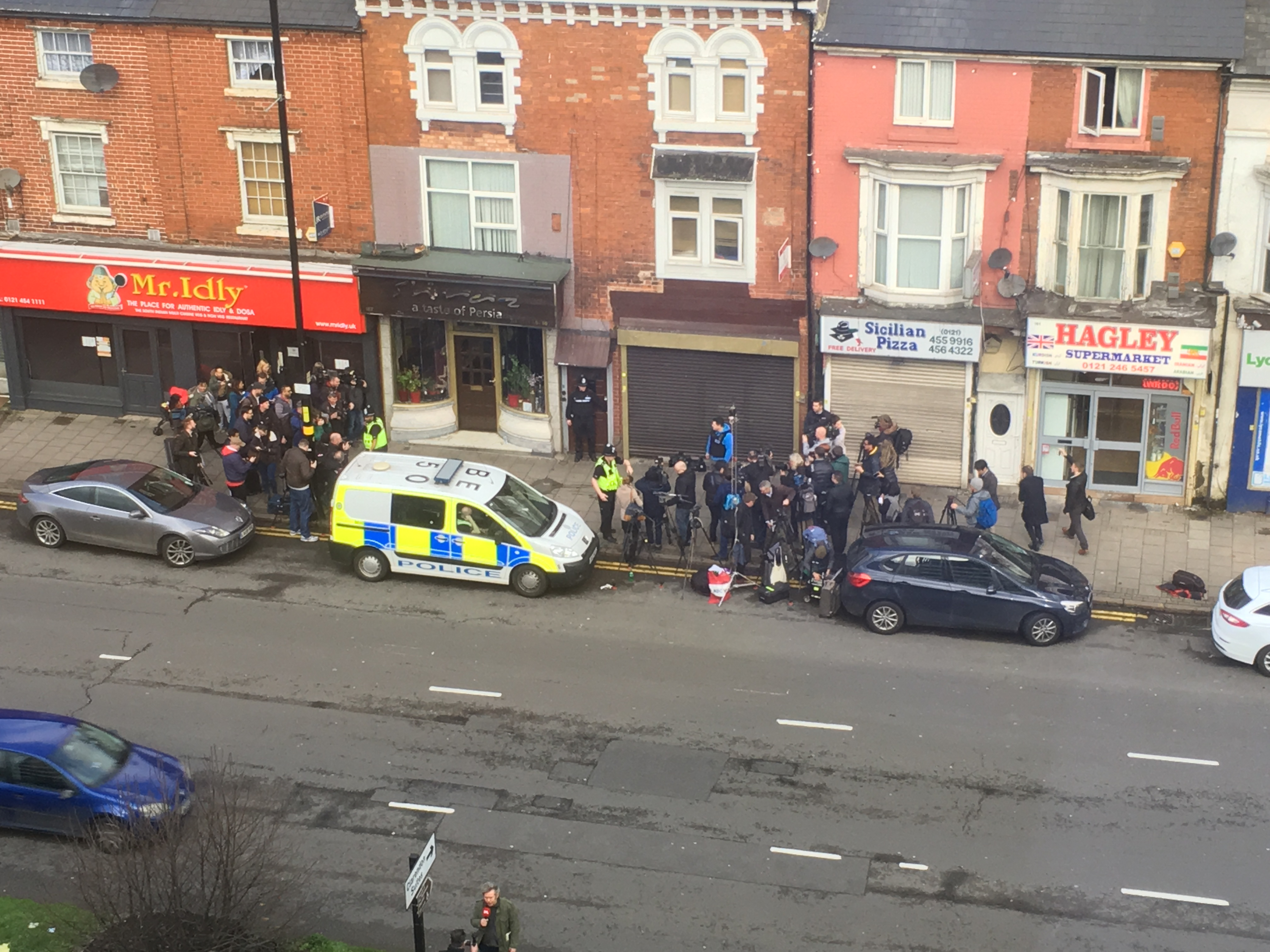
Police and media outside the Hagley Road premises that were raided on 22 March, seen on the morning following the raid

At 23:00 on 22 March, West Midlands Police raided a flat in Hagley Road, Birmingham. By the morning of 23 March, six locations in East London and Birmingham had been raided resulting in the arrests of eight people on suspicion of preparing terrorist acts. Officials also carried out searches in London, Brighton and Carmarthenshire. The investigation was named Operation Classific. By 24 March, three further arrests had taken place, two men overnight in the West Midlands and North West England and a woman during the day in Manchester. A woman, arrested earlier in East London, was released on bail. Later on 24 March, seven of those initially arrested were released without further action and the woman arrested in Manchester was released on bail.

By 25 March, only one man from Birmingham remained in custody and the woman on bail from East London had been removed from police enquiries. Up to that point in the investigation, 2,700 items had been seized and 3,500 witnesses had been contacted. A further arrest was made in Birmingham on 26 March. By 1 April, all twelve suspects arrested after the attack had been released without charge.

=== Inquests ===
Inquests for the dead victims were opened and adjourned on 29 March 2017, and into Masood's death the following day, both under the Senior Coroner for Westminster, Fiona Wilcox.

On 12 October 2018, the jury at the inquest into Masood's death, held under the direction of the Chief Coroner of England and Wales, Mark Lucraft, found that Masood had been lawfully killed by a minister's close protection officer identified only as SA74. Two plain-clothed armed officers from the Royalty and Specialist Protection branch of the Metropolitan Police became aware of the ongoing attack; SA74 recounted to the court how Masood had ignored shouted warnings and how he had opened fire in response to Masood running towards him brandishing a knife.

== Reactions ==
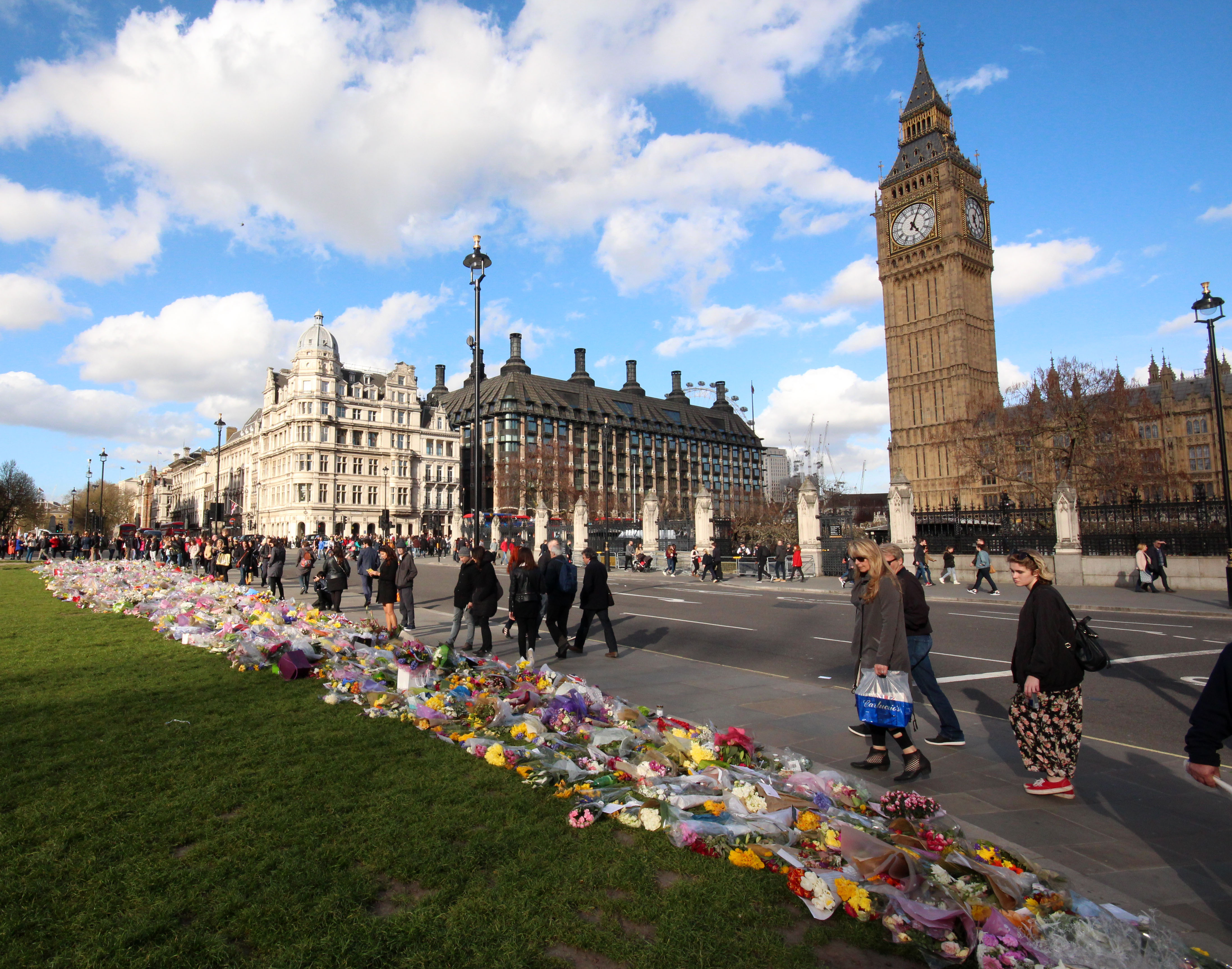
Floral tributes left in Parliament Square following the attack

Reactions to the attack expressed shock and outrage, and characterised it as an attack against liberty, freedom of speech, and democracy.

=== Domestic ===
Both the House of Commons and the House of Lords resumed their normal functions on 23 March, the day after the attack. A one-minute silence in honour of the dead was observed in Parliament, and by London's emergency services, at 09:33. The time was selected to coincide with the start of the day's official parliamentary business. In the morning session of parliament, Prime Minister Theresa May said that, "Yesterday an act of terrorism tried to silence our democracy, but today we meet as normal ... to deliver a simple message: We are not afraid and our resolve will never waver in the face of terrorism." In a later statement following the 2017 London Bridge attack, May stated that all three recent attacks were "bound together by the single evil ideology of Islamic extremism". The Labour leader Jeremy Corbyn, the Leader of the Opposition, described the attack as "an appalling atrocity". The speakers of both Houses of Parliament jointly offered sympathy to those affected, and thanked the emergency services. The Scottish Parliament suspended the day's proceedings, including a debate on a second independence referendum. Some MSPs who opposed the decision to suspend parliament said that doing so was "giving in to terrorism".

On 23 March, Christian, Hindu, Jewish, Muslim and Sikh faith leaders met officers at Scotland Yard to discuss responses to the attack. Muslim groups, including the Muslim Council of Britain, Ahmadi Muslims UK, and individual mosques across the country condemned the attack. That evening, there was a public candlelit vigil in Trafalgar Square to honour victims of the attack. It was led by the Mayor of London Sadiq Khan, the Home Secretary Amber Rudd and the Acting Metropolitan Commissioner Craig Mackey and attended by leaders of different faiths.

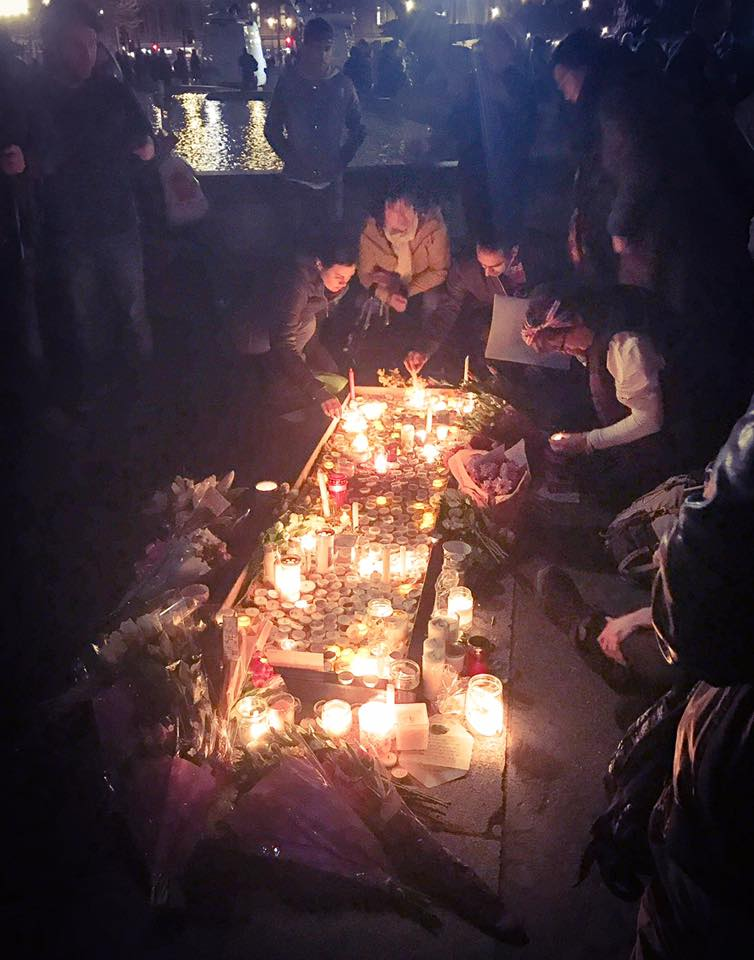
Candlelit vigil in Trafalgar Square on 23 March

The Metropolitan Police honoured PC Palmer by retiring his shoulder number 4157U; Charlton Athletic F.C. announced that his season ticket seat at the Valley would not be occupied at the club's next home game, but would instead have a club scarf placed over it as a mark of respect. A JustGiving fund was set up, with the target of raising £100,000 for his family, a goal attained in less than 24 hours. A group called "Muslims United for London" also raised over £29,000 to support victims and victims' families, releasing a statement saying, "The British Muslim community stands with the community during these difficult times". Home Secretary Amber Rudd announced that PC Palmer would be remembered at the National Memorial Arboretum's UK Police Memorial in Staffordshire.

On 24 March, Prince Charles visited victims of the attack at King's College Hospital; Tobias Ellwood was appointed to the Privy Council for his role in rendering aid to PC Palmer, as was security minister Ben Wallace MP, who helped co-ordinate the government response.

On 26 March, in an event organised by Women's March on London, roughly 100 women, including many Muslims, joined hands to form a chain along Westminster Bridge and stood in silence for five minutes to pay tribute to the victims of the attack. Amber Rudd appeared on BBC's The Andrew Marr Show to call for government backdoor access to encrypted messaging services like WhatsApp, which Masood used to send a message shortly before the attack. She announced a meeting with similar technology industry leaders for 30 March, where she would persuade them to voluntarily co-operate with the government. She refused to rule out passing new legislation to this end if the companies do not comply.

Prince William laid a wreath at the Arboretum in honour of PC Palmer on 29 March. In the 2017 Queen's Birthday Honours, Palmer was posthumously awarded the George Medal.

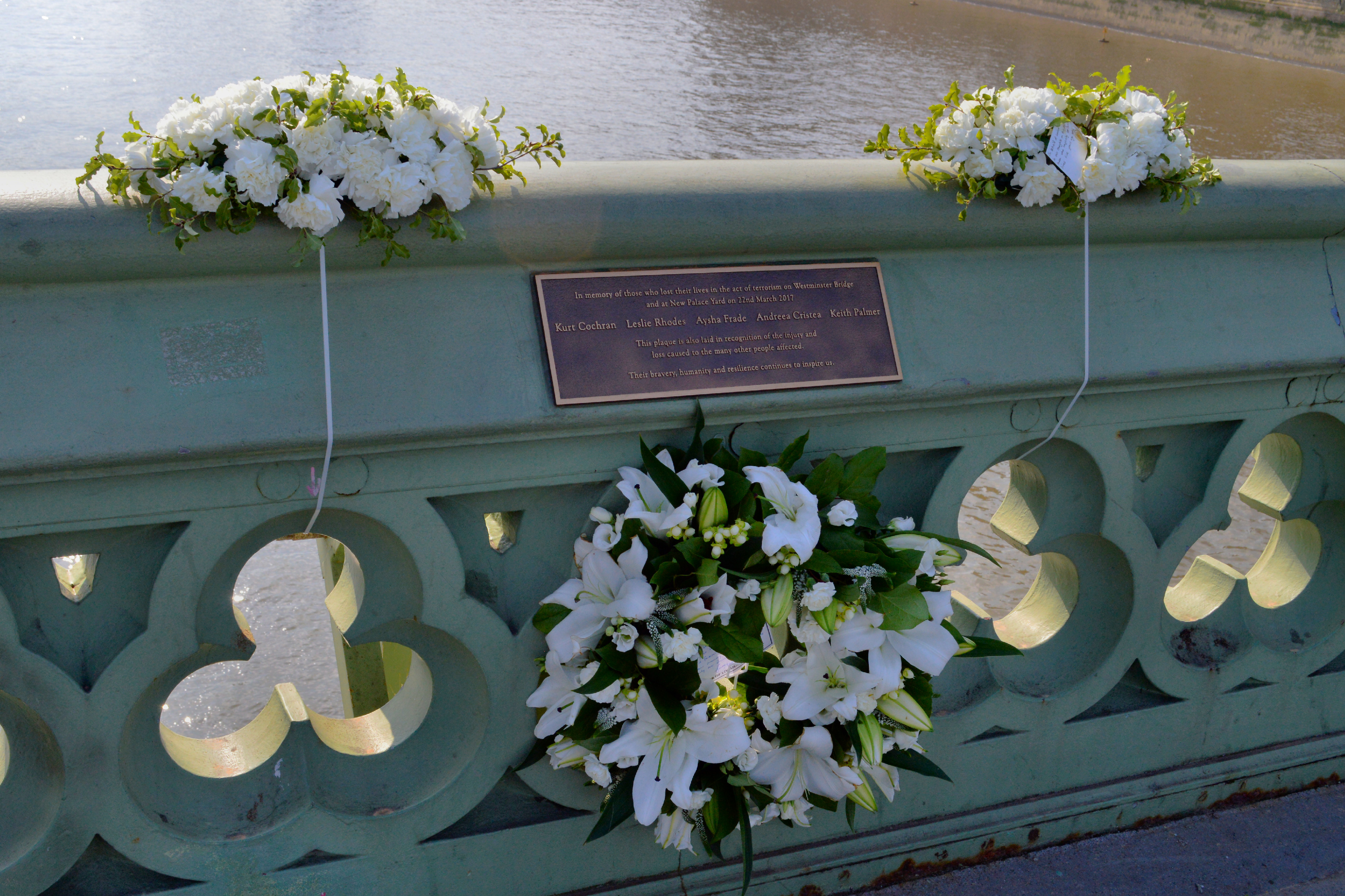
Westminster Bridge plaque

As part of the 2019 New Year Honours, six other constables, Andy Dunmore, John Kenealy, Stephen Marsh, Mary Mayes, Richard Moore, and Jerry Pearce, received the British Empire Medal following the attack, and PC Nick Carlisle was awarded the Queen's Police Medal for Distinguished Service. Acting Detective Sergeant Zac Idun, nurse Joy Ongcachuy, Peter Boorman of NHS England, and Claire Summers were all made OBEs for services in investigating the attacks and assisting the victims and their families.

On 22 March 2022, the five-year anniversary of the attack, a memorial service was held, and a memorial plaque installed on Westminster Bridge.

=== International ===
In addition to the expressions of shock, support, solidarity and sympathy offered by many national governments and heads of state, (Note: These included the governments and heads of state of: Algeria, Argentina, Armenia, Australia, Canada, China, Colombia, Czech Republic, Denmark, East Timor, Egypt, Finland, France, Germany, Hungary, India, Indonesia, Iran, Ireland, Israel, Italy, Japan, Jordan, Laos, Malaysia, the Netherlands, New Zealand, Pakistan, Philippines, Poland, Romania, Russia, Saudi Arabia, Singapore, South Korea, Spain, Sweden, Thailand, Tunisia, Turkey, Ukraine, the United States and Vietnam.) the United Nations Security Council observed a minute of silence at its morning meeting on 23 March. The attack was denounced by the European Commission President Jean-Claude Juncker and the Organisation of Islamic Cooperation.

On the evening of the attack, the Brandenburg Gate in Germany and Tel Aviv City Hall in Israel were illuminated with the Union Jack. At midnight that evening, the Eiffel Tower's lights were switched off to honour those killed in the London attack. On 23 March, Jean-Marc Ayrault, France's Minister of Foreign Affairs, came to London, where he first visited the hospital where three French high school students injured in the attack were being treated and later attended the morning session in the House of Commons.

== Documentary ==
The BBC TV documentary series Hospital was filming a routine meeting at St Mary's when the attack occurred; within minutes St Mary's declared a "major incident", one of several central London hospitals to do so. The cameras recorded the involvement of the emergency department and intensive care staff over the next few hours, and then followed the cases of three patients until their discharge. This episode was broadcast in June 2017.

== See also ==
- Downing Street mortar attack
- 1974 Houses of Parliament bombing
- List of British police officers killed in the line of duty
- List of terrorist incidents in Great Britain
- List of terrorist incidents in London
- List of vehicle-ramming attacks
- List of attacks on legislatures
- Stabbing as a terrorist tactic
