= Anti-Terrorist Branch =

Former unit of the Metropolitan Police

The Anti-Terrorist Branch (or SO13 by its designation) was a Specialist Operations (SO) branch of London's Metropolitan Police Service, formed to respond to terrorist activities within the capital and the surrounding areas.

== History ==
The Anti-Terrorist Branch (originally known as the Bomb Squad) was formed in January 1971 to deal with the Angry Brigade. During the 1970s it assisted in the campaign against the IRA, alongside Special Branch and the Security Service (MI5).

In 2005, the branch had 345 officers attached to it, with funding for another 500 being sought. The Metropolitan Police Commissioner, Ian Blair, announced later that year that some of the specialist operations units were to be "re-aligned".

In 2006 the Anti-Terrorist Branch and the Special Branch were merged, creating a new unit, the Counter Terrorism Command, or SO15.
