= Rupert Doone =

British dancer and theatre director (1903–1966)

Rupert Doone (born Reginald Woodfield, 14 August 1903 – 4 March 1966) was a British dancer, choreographer, theatre director, and teacher in London.

== Biography ==
Doone was born in Redditch, Worcestershire, from a Worcestershire family in reduced circumstances, but with a background that reportedly included a link with Shakespeare. His father was a needle factory foreman.

He left home at sixteen to begin his career as a dancer with no money. He led a precarious existence, scraping by on what he earned modeling at the Royal Academy and the Slade in order to pay for the lessons. At 19, he left London for Paris, where he became a protégé and lover of Jean Cocteau. He was later said to have been the last premier danseur engaged by Diaghilev for the Ballets Russes, remaining with the company only until Diaghilev's death in August 1929. He then made his way to the Festival Theatre, Cambridge, to learn acting and production, and there he became part of a play-reading group. In 1926 he met and fell in love with the painter Robert Medley, who was the co-founder of the Group Theatre. They lived together until Doone's death in Northampton in 1966.

In 1932, after Medley moved to London, the play-reading group evolved into the Group Theatre (London), which performed left-wing and avant-garde plays during the 1930s and again during its revival in the 1950s.

Despite his prominence in avant-garde theatre, Doone was thought to be a muddled and ineffective stage director by W. H. Auden, Stephen Spender and others, who tried to steer the Group Theatre into more effective productions and organization.

In the 1950s, Doone founded the Theatre School at Morley College, and worked there until his premature retirement as a result of multiple sclerosis.

A portrait of Doone as a young man was painted by Cedric Morris ca. 1923.

== Career ==
Doone was known for his imagination and artistic integrity in his work with Group Theatre and at the Morley College School of Drama.

Doone made rapid progress as a late starter in dance. He made his first performance in Basil Dean's production of James Elroy Fleck's play Hassan just after few years of his study. At this time, Donne changed his name to Rupert Doone.

- In 1923, Doone became the featured soloist of the Ballets Suédois. But he left the company after this.
- In 1924, Doone collaborated with Cocteau on the production of his Romeo and Juliet.
- In 1925, Doone fell in love with painter Robert Medley.
- In 1928, Doone partnered with Ver Trefilova in her last performances in Berlin. After the performance, Doone joined Ida Rubinstein's company to work about choreographer.
- In 1930, Doone's first acting role in the Festival Theatre in Cambridge in Lion Feuchtwanger's Warren Hastings.

=== Works ===
- The Dance of Death(1933)
- The Dog Beneath the Skin (1936)
- The Ascent of F6(1937)
- On the Frontier (1939)
