= Laurence Taylor =

British police officer

Laurence James Taylor KPM (born 1972) is a senior British police officer who is currently serving as Assistant Commissioner for Specialist Operations of the Metropolitan Police Service and Head of Counter Terrorism Policing.

Taylor has a degree in natural sciences from Durham University. He joined Sussex Police in 1996, eventually becoming Assistant Chief Constable before a transfer to the Metropolitan Police as a Deputy Assistant Commissioner in 2018. He was awarded the King's Police Medal in the 2026 Birthday Honours.

Taylor took charge of Counter Terrorism Policing in 2025. In his first media briefing he revealed there were "800 live investigations ongoing" and that counter-terrorism officers had made 248 arrests the previous year. He told The Guardian in April 2026 that the Prevent counter-extremism scheme was being "overwhelmed" by a large surge in referrals and advocated for a separate strategy to account for young people whose fascination with violence was not rooted in any particular ideology.
