= Group Theatre (London) =

The Group Theatre (London) was an experimental theatre company founded in 1932 by Rupert Doone and Robert Medley. It evolved from a play-reading group in Cambridge that Doone had been involved with during his years studying with the Cambridge Festival Theatre. The Group Theatre was active from 1932 to 1939 and reformed as The Group Theatre Ltd. in the early 1950s.

The Group performed plays written for it in the 1930s by W. H. Auden, both alone and in collaboration with Christopher Isherwood, Louis MacNeice, and Stephen Spender. It also produced plays by T. S. Eliot and other contemporary writers, and Elizabethan and medieval English plays.

Among the artists and musicians who worked with the Group were Henry Moore, Benjamin Britten, Brian Easdale and Rupert Shephard.
