= The Doctor Stories =

1984 short story collection by William Carlos Williams

- First edition cover
- Author: William Carlos Williams
- Language: English
- Genre: Short story collection
- Publisher: New Directions Publishing
- Publication date: 1984
- Publication place: United States
- Media type: Print (Paperback)
- Pages: 142
- ISBN: 0-8112-0926-1
- LC Class: PS3545.1544A6

The Doctor Stories is an eclectic collection of 13 works of short fiction by William Carlos Williams, compiled by Robert Coles and published by New Directions Publishing in 1984.

The stories are representative of Williams' autobiographical physician-patient narratives that characterize much of his short fiction.

== Stories ==
The works are listed under the collection in which they first appeared.

Those stories originally published in Blast are indicated with date of issue.

from The Knife of the Times and Other Stories (1932):

- "Mind and Body"
- "Old Doc Rivers"

from Life Along the Passaic River (1938):

- "A Face of Stone"
- "Jean Beicke" (Blast issue no. 1, 1933)
- "The Use of Force" (Blast issue no. 2, 1934)
- "The Girl With a Pimply Face" (Blast issue no. 4, 1934)
- "A Night in June" (Blast issue no. 5, 1934)
- "Danse Pseudomacabre"

from Make Light of It: Collected Stories of William Carlos Williams (1950):

- "The Paid Nurse"
- "Ancient Gentility"
- "Verbal Transcriptions: 6 A.M"
- "The Insane"
- "Comedy Entombed: 1930"

Poems

- "The Birth"
- "Le Médecin malgré lui"
- "Dead Baby"
- "A Cold Front"
- "The Poor"
- "Too Close"

"The Practice" (chapter from The Autobiography of William Carlos Williams)

Afterword: "My Father, The Doctor" (by William Eric Williams)

== Critical analysis ==
"In the collection, the modernist poet...turns toward the rhythms of his own daily life as a doctor in small town New Jersey, a profession the poet occupied until his death in 1963. Williams' practice as a doctor in Rutherford was not just a day job, but also a way by which he found words to express modern American life in poetry and prose...The Doctors Stories move like a surgeon: It makes you uncomfortable and looks at you naked. Then, it changes you..." — Literary critic Claudia Ross in Surgical Prose: On William Carlos Williams' "The Doctor Stories" in Cleveland Review of Books (2018)

Writing in The New York Times, poet and literary critic Harvey Shapiro comments on how the theme of the stories emerges directly from their composition:

Almost all the stories have a simple form. They begin with a telephone call for the doctor or the doctor entering the house of the sick. The concentration is on the action. The dialogue is given without commentary or quotation marks. The story moves rapidly. As the people disclose themselves to the doctor, the diagnosis is made and the story abruptly ends. But hidden in that process is a revelation for the doctor and the reader: Through coming to see others clearly, he comes to see himself.

== Sources ==
- Gish, Robert F. 1989. William Carlos Williams: A Study of the Short Fiction. Twayne Publishers, Boston, Massassachusetts. G. K. Hall & Co. Gordon Weaver, General Editor. ISBN 0-8057-8307-5
- Ross, Claudia. 2018. Surgical Prose: On William Carlos Williams' "The Doctor Stories." Cleveland Review of Books, September 25, 2018. https://www.clereviewofbooks.com/writing/2018/09/25/2018-9-25-doctorstories Retrieved 25 July 2023.
- Shapiro, Harvey. 1984. Books of The Times; A Physician's Stories in The New York Times Archives. The New York Times, October 20, 1984. https://www.nytimes.com/1984/10/20/books/books-of-the-times-a-physician-s-stories.html Retrieved 30 July 2023.
