= Classical Baby =

2005 HBO Family series

- Series DVD cover
- Directed by: Amy Schatz
- Theme music composer: Pyotr Ilyich Tchaikovsky (opening); Johannes Brahms (closing)
- Opening theme: "Concerto for Piano & Orchestra No. 1", performed by Philharmonic Slavonica
- Ending theme: "Lullaby", performed by Budapest Strings
- Composer: Joby Talbot (The Poetry Show)
- Country of origin: United States
- No. of episodes: 6

Production
- Running time: 26-28 minutes
- Production companies: Home Box Office, Inc. MaGiK Animation Studios; Poetry Foundation (2008)

Original release
- Network: HBO Family
- Release: May 14, 2005 – December 25, 2017

Classical Baby is an American animated television series for young children and families directed by Amy Schatz and produced by HBO. The animation was created and designed by Maciek Albrecht and MaGiK World Animation. Classical Baby is designed to introduce young children to masterpieces from the worlds of music, art, dance, and poetry. This series first aired on HBO Family on May 14, 2005.

The series has won 4 Emmy Awards, the Peabody Award, the Directors Guild of America Award, Parents' Choice Awards, and others.

The series won two Emmy Awards for Outstanding Children's Program and two Emmy Awards for Outstanding Individual Achievement in Animation, one given to animator Barbara Wierzchowska, and one to Jarek Szyszko.

It won a Peabody Award in 2005. The judges wrote: "This whimsical, charming, deceptively simple marriage of animation to the music of Tchaikovsky, Puccini, Mozart, Bach and Ellington becomes an interactive treat for young children and parents alike."

In 2017, two new lullaby-themed episodes aired on HBO and HBO Family: "Classical Baby: The Lullaby Show 1" and "Classical Baby: The Lullaby Show 2."

== Episodes ==
Classical Baby is currently available on HBO and Max as 6 different episodes:

- Classical Baby: The Music Show (May 14, 2005)
- Classical Baby: The Art Show (May 14, 2005)
- Classical Baby: The Dance Show (May 14, 2005)
- Classical Baby (I'm Grown Up Now): The Poetry Show (April 12, 2008)
- Classical Baby: The Lullaby Show 1 (December 24, 2017)
- Classical Baby: The Lullaby Show 2 (December 25, 2017)

Two compilation episodes had been available previously, consisting of selections taken from the first two episodes, and are not included on the DVD version:

- Classical Baby 1 (June 4, 2005)
- Classical Baby 2 (June 5, 2005)

=== The Music Show ===
1. Open, Music: "Piano Concerto No. 1"
  by Pyotr Ilyich Tchaikovsky
  performed by Philharmonic Slavonica
2. Bear Hugs, Music: "The Flower Duet" from Lakmé
  by Léo Delibes
  performed by Mady Mesplé (soprano) and Danielle Millet (mezzo-soprano)
  Orchestre du Théatre National de l'Opéra-Comique, Alain Lombard
3. Baby's Hands, "Von fremden Ländern und Menschen" from Kinderszenen, Op. 15, No. 1
  by Robert Schumann
  performed by Vladimir Horowitz, piano
4. Baby Steps, "Dance of the Reed-Flutes"
  by Pyotr Ilyich Tchaikovsky
  performed by the Berlin Philharmonic, Peter Wohlert, conductor
5. Busy Caterpillar, "Prelude" from Cello Suite No. 1 in G major, BWV 1007
  by Johann Sebastian Bach
  performed by Yo-Yo Ma, cello
6. The Cow Song, "O mio babbino caro" from Gianni Schicchi
  by Giacomo Puccini
  performed by Ying Huang, soprano, London Symphony Orchestra, James Conlon, conductor
7. Good Morning, Peer Gynt: "Morning Mood"
  by Edvard Grieg
  performed by CSFR State Philharmonic Orchestra (Kosice), Stephen Gunzenhauser
8. Night Music, "Eine kleine Nachtmusik"
  by Wolfgang Amadeus Mozart
  performed by Cappella Istropolitana, Wolfgang Sobotka, conductor (a baby)
9. Aquarium, "Aquarium" from The Carnival of the Animals
  by Camille Saint-Saëns
  performed by Chamber Ensemble Philippe Entremont and Gaby Casadesus, pianos
10. Musical Faces, "A Mare Encheu"
  by Heitor Villa-Lobos
  performed by Christina Ortiz
11. Appalachian Spring, "Appalachian Spring Ballet Suite" Moderato coda movement
  by Aaron Copland
  performed by London Symphony Orchestra, Aaron Copland, conductor
12. The Cricket on the Roof, "Stamping Dance" from Romanian Folk Dances, Sz. 56
  written by Béla Bartók
  performed by Midori, violin, Robert McDonald, piano
13. My Blanket, "Clair de lune"
  by Claude Debussy
  performed by CSR Symphony Orchestra (Bratislava), Keith Clark, conductor
14. "Lullaby"
  by Johannes Brahms
  performed by Budapest Strings (ending credits)

=== The Art Show ===
1. Open, Music: Piano Concerto No. 1
  by Pyotr Ilyich Tchaikovsky
  performed by Philharmonic Slavonica
2. Frogs, Music: Gymnopédie No. 3 by Erik Satie, painting by Claude Monet
3. I Love You, Music: Piano Trio No. 1 in B♭, 2nd movement, by Franz Schubert, paintings by Mary Cassatt
4. Shapes, based on a painting by Joan Miró, with music by Johann Sebastian Bach, Keyboard Concerto No. 5 in F minor, BWV 1056: II. Largo
5. The Museum, with music by Gabriel Fauré, Dolly Suite, Op. 56
6. Trucks, with music by Duke Ellington, painting by Fernand Léger
7. Dance Class, Music: Dance of the Hours by Amilcare Ponchielli, painting by Edgar Degas
8. The Conductor, Music: The Blue Danube by Johann Strauss, performed by Vienna Opera Orchestra (a baby)
9. The Kiss, Music: Salut d'Amour by Edward Elgar, performed by Midori, painting by Marc Chagall
10. Art Faces, Music: "Habanera" Carmen Suite No. 2 by Georges Bizet
11. Busy Bees, Music: Flight of the Bumblebee by Nikolai Rimsky-Korsakov, painting by Jackson Pollock
12. City Streets, with music by Count Basie, painting by Piet Mondrian
13. The Sculpture Garden, Music: Solace, a Mexican serenade by Scott Joplin
14. The Starry Night, Music: Reverie by Claude Debussy, painting by Vincent van Gogh
15. Baby paints with music by Frédéric Chopin – Prelude in A major, Op. 28 No. 7 (a baby)
16. Lullaby by Johannes Brahms performed by Budapest Strings (ending credits)

=== The Dance Show ===
1. Open
  Music: "Piano Concerto No. 1" Pyotr Ilyich Tchaikovsky (performed by Philharmonic Slavonica)
2. Waltz of the Flowers
  Dance inspired by George Balanchine
  Music: "Waltz of the Flowers" from "The Nutcracker" "Pyotr Ilyich Tchaikovsky"
3. Dancing Sheep to Sheep, featuring Cheek to Cheek
  Music: Irving Berlin performed by The Boston Pops
4. Barn Dance
  Dance inspired by the "Dance of the Little Swans"
  from "Swan Lake" Music Pyotr Ilyich Tchaikovsky (London Festival Orchestra)
5. Mambo
  Music: "Mambo No. 5" (Original 1940s recording) performed by Pérez Prado (babies)
6. The Swan
  Dance inspired by Anna Pavlova
  Music: "The Swan" from "The Carnival of the Animals" Camille Saint-Saëns by Joshua Bell
7. The Rectangles
  Dance inspired by Jerome Robbins
  Music: "Prologue" from "West Side Story" by Leonard Bernstein
8. The Scarecrow
  Dance inspired by Martha Graham
  Music: Aaron Copland
9. Tap Dance
  Dance inspired by the Nicholas Brothers
  Music: "I Got Rhythm" George and Ira Gershwin performed by Oscar Peterson
10. Sleepy Lion
  Music: "Mbube" performed by Miriam Makeba & the C. Mitchell Trio
11. Dancers
  dance inspired by Pilobolus
  Music: Gnossienne No. 1 by Erik Satie
12. The Hippo Dance
  Music: "Sugar Rum Cherry" by Duke Ellington
13. Dancin' in the Rain (a baby)
14. Lullaby by Johannes Brahms performed by Budapest Strings (ending credits)

=== The Poetry Show ===
1. Stopping by Woods on a Snowy Evening by Robert Frost – narrated by Susan Sarandon
2. The Swing by Robert Louis Stevenson – performed by Beverly Gile & Frances Archer
3. The Red Wheelbarrow by William Carlos Williams
4. Grassy Grass Grass by Woody Guthrie – narrated by Elizabeth Mitchell
5. The Owl and the Pussycat by Edward Lear – narrated by John Lithgow
6. Sonnet XVIII by William Shakespeare – narrated by Jeffrey Wright
7. Mariposa (Butterfly) by Federico García Lorca – narrated by Andy Garcia
8. This Is Just To Say by William Carlos Williams
9. Skylark by Johnny Mercer
10. April Rain Song by Langston Hughes
11. A Very Valentine by Gertrude Stein
12. Who Has Seen the Wind? by Christina Rossetti
13. How Do I Love Thee? by Elizabeth Barrett Browning – narrated by Gwyneth Paltrow
14. Ending credits by Jody Talbot

=== The Lullaby Show ===
1. Open, Music: Piano Concerto No. 1 by Pyotr ilyich Tchaikovsky performed by Philharmonic Slavonica
2. Naptime "Drume Negrita", a Cuban lullaby, sung by Bola de Nieve
3. Moonlight "Liebestraum No. 3", music by Franz Liszt performed by Balázs Szokolay
4. The Kiss "Suliram", an Indonesian lullaby, sung by Miriam Makeba
5. Little Willow, written, sung and performed by Paul McCartney
6. The Violin "Oyfn Pripetshik", a Yiddish lullaby, performed by Itzhak Perlman
7. Goodnight "Goodnight", written and sung by Laurie Berkner
8. Night Light "Gymnopédie No. 1", music by Erik Satie performed by Kiara Kormendi (a Baby)
9. Night Swim "White Seal Lullaby", based on a British poem by Rudyard Kipling, written sung and performed by Corinne Bailey Rae
10. Hush-A-Bye "Hush-a-Bye", an American traditional, sung by Peter, Paul & Mary
11. Cradle Song "Schlafe, mein Prinzchen, schlaf ein", a German lullaby, sung by Rita Streich (soprano)
12. The Dream "Hush, Hush (Thula, Thula)", a Zulu lullaby, sung by Harry Belafonte
13. Sweet Dreams "Dream Angus", a Scottish lullaby, sung by Gary Lightbody
14. "Lullaby" by Johannes Brahms performed by Budapest Strings (ending credits)

=== The Lullaby Show Part 2 ===
1. Open, Music: Piano Concerto No. 1 by Pyotr llyich Tchaikovsky performed by Philharmonic Slavonica
2. The Painting "Méditation from Thaïs", music by Jules Massenet performed by Camerata Transylvanica
3. Bedtime "Fais Do Do", a French lullaby, sung by Elizabeth Mitchell & Lisa Loeb
4. Twilight "Lullaby", music by George Gershwin performed by Serafin String Quartet
5. Little Buckaroo "Hush Little Baby", an American traditional, sung by Rufus Wainwright, Martha Wainwright, Lucy Wainwright Roche & David Mansfield
6. Flying "Barcarolle from The Tales of Hoffmann", music by Jacques Offenbach performed by Keith Clark & Slovak Radio Symphony Orchestra
7. Hugs "Sleep Little One (Nami Nami)", an Arabic lullaby, sung by Oumaima Khalil and Marcel Khalife
8. Meditation "Berceuse in D-flat major, Op. 57", music by Frédéric Chopin performed by Jane Coop (a Baby)
9. Flower Dance "O cravo brigou com a rosa", a Brazilian lullaby, sung by Natasha Llerena and Heitor Pereira
10. Underwater "Nana", music by Manuel de Falla
11. Barefoot "Dreaming", music by Amy Beach performed by Ambache
12. Cuddle "A la nanita nana", a Spanish lullaby, sung by Marta Gómez
13. Falling Leaves "Wiegenlied, Op. 49, No. 4", music by Johannes Brahms, performed by Yo-Yo Ma and Kathryn Stott
14. Lullaby in Ragtime sung by Ron Sexsmith (ending credits)
