= Jean Beicke =

Short story by William Carlos Williams

- Short story by William Carlos Williams
- Country: United States
- Language: English

Publication
- Published in: Blast
- Publication date: 1933

"Jean Beicke" is a short story by William Carlos Williams first published in Blast: A Magazine of Proletarian Short Stories in 1933. The story appeared in the 1938 collection Life Along the Passaic River.

"Jean Beicke" has been termed "a quintessential Willams short story." and was among Wiliams' own favorites in his Passaic short story collection.

== Plot ==
"Jean Beicke" (pronounced BIKE-uh), is told in a first-person narrative by a practicing physician. The story is set in a children's ward in a city hospital during the Great Depression. Sick or unwanted infants are frequently abandoned there by impoverished parents who cannot care for them. The narrator describes a number of the children treated at the facility, some in relatively good health, others near death due to neglect.

An eleven-month-old infant, Jean Beicke arrives at the hospital in alarmingly poor health. Her physical development is stunted: she is grossly underweight and seemingly deformed. The girl screams whenever she is gently handled by the nurses. The doctor-narrator orders a number of medical procedures, including a lumbar puncture due to the infant's inflamed ear drums and high fever. A spinal tap and a chest X-ray are also performed. None of these provide the source of the child's ailment. Jean appears to improve with a proper diet. The staff at the children's ward become increasingly attached to the odd and suffering infant. A sense of dread takes hold of the caregivers, including the doctors, who watch the child as she struggles to survive.

After several weeks, the child's temperature suddenly rises to 108 degrees Fahrenheit. The infant's young mother and an elder aunt arrive for the death watch. The doctor speaks to the aunt and learns that the mother has been abandoned by her husband. The aunt declares that the infant is better off dead, as her mother is unable to support her other older child. The doctor secures permission to conduct an autopsy on Jean. The pediatric nurse closest to Jean cannot bring herself to attend the medical inquest. The post mortem reveals that the infant was generally improving, but that an overlooked infection in the mastoid process, as in the case in which the left lateral sinus had completely thrombosed: this undetected condition killed the infant.

The story closes with the doctor-narrator and the ear specialist acknowledging that, had they properly diagnosed the ailment, they could have saved the girl.

== Theme ==
"The whole story is an elegy for Jean, for her condition (physical and social), and an apology by the physician for his mistaken diagnosis and the fallibility of science, of doctors, of humanity. But it is also a celebration of mankind's need for contact, for the medical professions need to know the truth, regardless of attendant excuse or explanation. Williams underscores all this with a tremendously prominent narrative voice...with descriptions that are both grotesque and beautiful."—Biographer Robert F. Gish in William Carlos Williams: A Study of the Short Fiction (1973),

Literary critic Nasrullah Mambrol remarks on Williams' use of story structure to convey his theme:

The story's careful structure takes us from external details—Jean's misshapen body, tiny face, and pale blue eyes—to internal ones—in the postmortem—and so suggests that beneath society's superficial ills lie fundamental, perhaps incurable, troubles...the author's main achievement is to individualize yet not sentimentalize Jean and to dramatize her life-and-death struggle so that it matters to him—and to the reader."

Literary critic George Monteiro notes that Williams' account of the autopsy contrasts the humane impulses that motivate the medical professionals involved while the patient still lived, and with a detachment that allows the doctors to reassert a measure of control after the death of the patient: "[T]he doctor, who had been so solicitous...was now cooly clinical." The autopsy, though exposing failures in the podiatrists diagnosis, is rewarded by "discovering the logic of the disease...Satisfaction has come with post-mortem knowledge. The child has disappeared into the inquest. The physician's faith in science and his craft is intact." Monteiro adds: "What gives this story its power is that the wisecracking and the running diagnosis cum (italics) treatment cannot eradicate the narrator's affections. They can, from time to time, encapsulate them."

== Sources ==
- Gish, Robert F. 1989. William Carlos Williams: A Study of the Short Fiction. Twayne Publishers, Boston, Massassachusetts. G. K. Hall & Co. Gordon Weaver, General Editor. ISBN 0-8057-8307-5
- Koch Vivienne. 1950. "The Novels and Short Stories," in William Carlos Williams, New Directions Publishing, 1950, pp. 187–246.
- Mambrol, Nasrullah (June 26, 2020). "Analysis of William Carlos Williams's Stories". Literariness (Kannur University).
- Monteiro, George. 1980. "The Doctor's Black Bag: William Carlos Williams' Passaic River Stories," in Modern Language Studies, Vol. XIII, No. 1, Winter, 1983, pp. 77–84. in William Carlos Williams: A Study of the Short Fiction by Robert F. Gish, Twayne Publishers, Boston, Massachusetts. G. K. Hall & Co. Gordon Weaver, General Editor. pp. 169–175 ISBN 0-8057-8307-5
- Williams, Willam Carlos. 1961 The Farmers' Daughters: The Collected Stories of William Carlos Williams. New Directions Publishing, New York. pp. 158–166 ISBN 0-8112-0228-3
