= The Colored Girls of Passenack—Old and New =

1932 short story by William Carlos Williams

- Short story by William Carlos Williams
- Country: United States
- Language: English

Publication
- Published in: The Knife of the Times and Other Stories
- Publication date: 1932

"The Colored Girls of Passenack—Old and New" is a short story by William Carlos Williams first published in the collection The Knife of the Times and Other Stories (1932) by Dragon Press.

The collection includes an Introduction by literary critic Van Wyck Brooks.

== Plot ==
The story presents vignettes or sketches describing the white author-narrator's encounters with five black women from his puberty and his adulthood as a medical practitioner and employer of black domestic help. The "Old" individuals are drawn from Williams' childhood and early career, the "New" those episodes at the time of his writing stories in the 1930s. Georgie Anderson is an eighteen-year-old black domestic worker serving in the home of the then 10-year-old narrator and his parents. He and his brother are deeply impressed with Georgie's character and talents as a tom-boy-like playmate, despite her incompetence as a housekeeper and cook. Spying on her while she is bathing his first view of a naked woman—he is secretly enthralled by her beauty.

Mable Watts is a black woman whom the young narrator-physician treats at his office. He declines her offer of sex, but admires her presence and physique as reminiscent of Goya's Maja Desnuda. He later delivers two of Mabel's children and treats her for venereal disease. Mable tragically loses her daughter, likely strangled to death.

The narrator describes Mable as immaculately groomed, uncompromising in her individuality, "never subservient" nor "insolent" and always "serious and respectful" in her social relationships.

The remaining three sketches concern black female domestic workers and patients. One woman is caught in an attempt to pilfer cash from her employer's purse and is dismissed. The narrator is nonetheless inspired with the quality of her character: "mental alertness, coupled with her erectness, muscular power, youth, seriousness—her actuality—made me want to create a new race on the spot."

Another unnamed domestic employee serving the narrator and his wife has recently divorced her husband, who was having numerous affairs. The woman's infant child is boarded with a local neighbor. "Alert" and "a fine physical specimen", she was once employed at a Chinese-American -owned laundry where she and her female co-workers ironed clothing at a picture window facing the street. When a man began making sexual advances towards her she was forced to leave the job.

Julia, a laundress who works for one of the narrator's white patients, describes the young woman's personal difficulties. She abruptly abandons her duties one afternoon, insisting she must go home. Later she informs her employer that she discovered her husband in bed with another woman. When she demands that the woman leave her home, she is scorned by the two adulterers.

== Historical context and critical assessment ==
"The Colored Girls of Passenack-Old and New" provides "an autobiographical reminiscences" of five black woman Williams encountered who influenced his early sexual awareness as a boy and his professional development as writer while acting as their employer or personal physician. The story, written in the 1930s, may appear unenlightened in the post-Civil Rights and Feminist movements of the 1960s and 70s. Literary critic Robert F. Gish writes:

"The Colored Girls of Passenack - Old and New" offers an interesting psychological and social "history" of racial and sexual attitudes during Williams' and his parents' times—from about 1895 to the 1920s. Ironically, the very appeal that black culture and black women hold for the narrator-author makes his liberal and, for the time, enlightened attitude toward blacks seem somewhat embarrassing and paternalistic by today's standards. In the 1980s concerns about "racist" stereotypes linger so that the words of the title, "Colored Girls," and the word "girl," plus the narrator's assumption that black women are always erotic, vital, animalistic and attracted to white males, detract from what the author-narrator no doubt intended as a positive and complimentary portrait.

Gish adds that "the story, in its intent, is a testimonial to the beauty of black women, who are some respects set above white women by Williams."

Literary critic James E. B. Breslin, remarks on the "profound physical force" which operates on the narrator-physician in his response to a black female patient in "The Colored Girls of Passenack":

[T]he passage illustrates one of the remarkable effects Williams achieves in this fiction: his ability through external description to create the sense of deep contact with a character...

== Sources ==
- Breslin, James E. B. 1985. "The Fiction of a Doctor" from William Carlos Williams: An American Artist in William Carlos Williams: A Study of the Short Fiction by Robert F. Gish, Twayne Publishers, Boston, Massachusetts. G. K. Hall & Co.. Gordon Weaver, General Editor. pp. 175–178 ISBN 0-8057-8307-5
- Gish, Robert F. 1989. William Carlos Williams: A Study of the Short Fiction. Twayne Publishers, Boston, Massassachusetts. G. K. Hall & Co.. Gordon Weaver, General Editor. ISBN 0-8057-8307-5
- Wagner, Linda Welshimer (1970). The Prose of William Carlos Williams. Middletown, Connecticut: Wesleyan University Press. p. 244. ISBN 978-0819540263.
- Williams, Willam Carlos. 1961 The Farmers' Daughters: The Collected Stories of William Carlos Williams. New Directions Publishing, New York. pp. 50–57 ISBN 0-8112-0228-3
