= The Farmers' Daughters: The Collected Short Stories of William Carlos Williams =

Short story collection by William Carlos Williams

The Farmers' Daughters: The Collected Stories of William Carlos Williams
- First edition cover
- Language: English
- Genre: Short Stories
- Publisher: New Directions Publishing
- Publication date: 1961
- Publication place: United States
- Media type: Print (hardcover)
- ISBN: 978-0811202282

The Farmers' Daughters: The Collected Short Stories of William Carlos Williams is a collection of short fiction by William Carlos Williams published in 1961 by New Directions Publishing. The volume is an amalgamation of the stories previously included in The Knife of the Times and Other Stories (1932) and Life Along the Passaic River (1938), as well as 20 stories first collected in Make Light of It (1950) and presented under the heading Beer and Cold Cuts.

== Stories ==
The 52-story volume is an amalgamation of the short fiction published by New Directions in 1961. These works first appeared in The Knife of the Times and Other Stories (1932) and Life Along the Passaic River (1938), as well as 20 uncollected stories listed under the heading “Beer and Cold Cuts” published in Make Light of It: Collected Stories of William Carlos Williams (1950).

The collection also includes “The Farmers’ Daughters” - his longest short story - which was completed in 1961 and the only work that had not been included in previous collections. The volume includes an Introduction by biographer and critic Van Wyck Brooks.

Literary critic Robert F. Gish writes:

It is clear that the fifty-two stories that compose these four volumes of short stories point to the 1920s and 1930s, prolific decades for Williams - twenty years in which short stories occupied a significant part of his attention.”

== Stories ==
The Knife of the Times and Other Stories (1932)
Life Along the Passaic River (1938)

=== Beer and Cold Cuts ===
"The Burden of Loneliness"
"Above the River"
"No Place for a Woman"
"The Paid Nurse"
"Frankie and the Newspaperman"
"Ancient Gentility"
"The Final Embarrassment"
"The Round the World Fliers"
"The Redhead"
"Verbal Transcription: 6 A.M."
"The Insane"
"The Good Old Days"
"A Good-Natured Sloth"
"A Lucky Break"
"The Pace That Kills"
"Lena"
"Country Rain"
"Inquest"
"Comedy Entombed"
"The Zoo"

=== Long short story ===
“The Farmers's Daughters”

== Sources ==
- Gish, Robert F. 1989. William Carlos Williams: A Study of the Short Fiction. Twayne Publishers, Boston, Massassachusetts. G. K. Hall & Co. Gordon Weaver, General Editor. ISBN 0-8057-8307-5
- Mambrol, Nasrullah (June 26, 2020). "Analysis of William Carlos Williams's Stories". Literariness (Kannur University).
- Monteiro, George. 1980. "The Doctor's Black Bag: William Carlos Williams' Passaic River Stories," in Modern Language Studies, Vol. XIII, No. 1, Winter, 1983, pp. 77–84.
- Wagner, Linda Welshimer (1970). The Prose of William Carlos Williams. Middletown, Connecticut: Wesleyan University Press. p. 244. ISBN 978-0819540263.
- Whitaker, Thomas R. 1968. "On the Ground" in William Carlos Williams, Twayne Publishers. Boston, Massachusetts. pp. 97–118. ISBN 9780805708165
