= A Night in June =

Short story by William Carlos Williams

- Short story by William Carlos Williams
- Country: United States
- Language: English

Publication
- Published in: Blast
- Publication date: November 1934

"A Night in June" is a short story by William Carlos Williams, first published in Blast (November 1934). The story appeared in the 1938 collection Life Along the Passaic River, New Dimensions publishers.

== Plot ==
A pediatrician delivers a child at the home of a family of poor Italian immigrants. The mother, "Angelina", is the matriarch, and the doctor has attended all of her children's births; this the ninth. The doctor has developed a sympathetic affection for the woman. She speaks very little English, but is a person of great simplicity and courage. As a younger man, he had been unable to save her first child, who died during the delivery, for which the doctor still carries regret.

Notified after dark on a pleasant June night that Angelina is in labor, he arrives at 3 a.m. The entire family has gathered quietly in the household, and offers him assistance. He naps in the kitchen awaiting her contractions. A sense of well-being comforts and refreshes him. Angelina and the pediatrician cooperate in close physical contact to deliver the child. A healthy baby girl is born.

== Theme ==
Though Williams was less a political writer and more a literary artist, he collaborated with the editors of the literary journal Blast: A Magazine of Proletarian Short Stories on a number of pieces in 1933 and 1934, at the height of the Great Depression. Literary critic Robert F. Gish noted that "No more proletarian and poignant story (toughly poignant, not sentimental) can be found than 'A Night in June'."

Critic Linda Welshimer Wagner considered the story "One of the most direct recounting of Williams' experiences as a doctor".

The rejuvenation that the doctor experiences in the presence of the birth event makes him hesitate momentarily to follow scientific protocols. Literary critic Robert F. Gish wrote:

Even in her squalid surroundings, the woman is clean, a cleanliness of a biologically ideal birth, and the doctor is tempted to resist the science's counsel to put anti-gonorrhea drops in the new baby girl's eyes ...

Literary Marjorie Perloff detected an erotic element in the story:

Here, delivery becomes deliverance. The physical ritual of the birth process becomes, in Williams' account, a variation on the act of love—the welcome fell of the woman's hands, the pressing down, the strong pull, the relief and relaxation ... by such contact the doctor is "comforted and soothed." And yet this erotic experience is "permitted by the poet's medical badge" and hence domesticated, made safe.

The story concludes as a celebration of the natural beauty and endurance of the working class, of which the narrator has himself evolved socially and professionally to appreciate and gladly serve.

== Sources ==
- Gish, Robert F. 1989. William Carlos Williams: A Study of the Short Fiction. Twayne Publishers, Boston, Massassachusetts. G. K. Hall & Co. Gordon Weaver, General Editor. ISBN 0-8057-8307-5
- Marjorie Perloff. 1980. "The Man Who Loved Women: The Medical Fictions of William Carlos Williams" from Georgia Review 34, no. 4 (Winter 1980) in William Carlos Williams: A Study of the Short Fiction by Robert F. Gish, Twayne Publishers, Boston, Massachusetts. G. K. Hall & Co. Gordon Weaver, General Editor. pp. 182–196 ISBN 0-8057-8307-5
- Wagner, Linda Welshimer (1970). The Prose of William Carlos Williams. Middletown, Connecticut: Wesleyan University Press. p. 244. ISBN 978-0819540263.
- Whitaker, Thomas R. 1968. "On the Ground" in William Carlos Williams, Twayne Publishers. Boston, Massachusetts. pp. 97–118. ISBN 9780805708165
