= An Old Time Raid =

Short story by William Carlos Williams

- Short story by William Carlos Williams
- Country: United States
- Language: English

Publication
- Published in: The Knife of the Times and Other Stories
- Publication date: 1932

"An Old Time Raid" is a short story by William Carlos Williams first published in the collection The Knife of the Times and Other Stories (1932) by New Directions Publishing.

== Plot ==
The story is presented from a first-person point-of-view, the narrator recounting his experiences in the company of a free-spirited youth, "Dago" Shultz.

The narrator recalls a number of their alcohol-induced escapades dating from around 1900. The pair, led by the bolder Schulz, engage in a series of pranks, gags and general mischief around town involving local businesses; the police are summoned but the boys at first evade them.

Schultz's provocations compel ushers to attempt to eject the two from a movie theatre, and the boys get into a physical altercation with the bouncer. A crowd gathers anticipating a brawl after a policeman arrives. When the cop attempts to take Schultz into custody, the youth knocks him semi-conscious with his fists. The policeman recovers and begins to pursue Schultz. The crowd makes way for the fugitive, but purposely blocks the officer. The narrator soon locates Schultz taking refuge in the cellar of a saloon. Still intoxicated, Schultz insists on returning to the theatre to demand a refund for their tickets. When he enters the lobby he is instantly thrown off the premises, and a policeman posted nearby clips him with a billy club and arrests him.

The narrator describes his last encounter with Schultz three years later. He and several other young people are running to hop a freight train; the narrator suspects that Schultz is drunk. Though an expert train hopper, Schultz apparently miscalculates, loses his grip, and is killed by a locomotive going in the opposite direction.

== Theme ==
Literary critic Vivienne Kock notes the comedic elements that emerge in the story: "'An Old Time Raid' reveals a special attempt to come to grips with character as it responds to or stems from American social habit and values. When the character is treated on a humorous, anecdotal level as in 'An Old Time Raid,' the story becomes essentially a study in manners...The social environment is reported, but it is also questioned. The result is comedy..."

Biographer Thomas R. Whitaker considers the story a negative critique of a bygone era in which a degree of lawless individualism was condoned and even applauded:

The accurately heard speaking voice is a key to greater intensity in "An Old Time Raid," where the first-person narration stylistically renders the theme—a vacuous violence, without self-comprehension, born of hidden frustration. In this instance, an anecdote widens to become a character study and a study of an entire deformed [social] milieu."

The story is an allegory of a passing era in American social history, before the proliferation of automobiles, when public drunkenness was tolerated as a social nuisance but generally not regarded as a criminal offense. Just as "Dago's days were surely numbered" this era was being displaced by an emerging modernity and a stricter social order. Literary critic Robert F. Gish writes:

It is a fitting outcome for Dago's life, another aspiring roamer, a free-spirited hobo whose freedom and daring led to death. The consolation, and an ironic, ambivalent one, is that he literally did not know what hit him, and went out in his own kind of style and gory glory.

== Sources ==
- Gish, Robert F. 1989. William Carlos Williams: A Study of the Short Fiction. Twayne Publishers, Boston, Massassachusetts. G. K. Hall & Co. Gordon Weaver, General Editor. ISBN 0-8057-8307-5
- Koch Vivienne. 1950. "The Novels and Short Stories," in William Carlos Williams, New Directions Publishers, 1950, pp. 187–246.
- Mambrol, Nasrullah (June 26, 2020). "Analysis of William Carlos Williams's Stories". Literariness.org., (Kannur University).
- Whitaker, Thomas R. 1968. "On the Ground" in William Carlos Williams (1968), Twayne Publishers. Boston, Massachusetts. pp. 97–118. ISBN 9780805708165
- Williams, Willam Carlos. 1961 The Farmers' Daughters: The Collected Stories of William Carlos Williams. New Directions Publishing, New York. pp. 26–32 ISBN 0-8112-0228-3
