= A Face of Stone =

Short story by William Carlos Williams

- Short story by William Carlos Williams
- Country: United States
- Language: English

Publication
- Published in: Life Along the Passaic River
- Publication date: 1938

"A Face of Stone" is a short story by William Carlos Williams, written in 1934 and first collected in Life Along the Passaic River (1938) by New Directions Publishing.

== Plot ==
The story is told in a first-person narrative by a family physician. Overworked and irritable, the doctor receives a young Polish family into his office. Poor Jewish immigrants, the couple is anxious about the health of their infant child. The doctor instantly finds their demeanor objectionable, which he attributes to their Jewishness; the wife is stony-faced. The mutual distrust persists until the doctor examines the infant and discovers that the beaming baby boy is perfectly healthy; the doctor is cheered and begins to regain his composure. The husband calls attention to his wife's legs: the 24-year-old woman is suffering from crippling varicose veins due to her ill-fitting shoes. The physician carefully binds her legs and gives her medication. A smile appears on the woman's face, and with it the doctor recognizes the deep affection that sustains the family. The physician is freed from his own "face of stone."

== Background ==
Betty and Fred Miller, editors for Blast, a magazine featuring proletarian short stories, published a number of Williams's works in 1933-1934 in the five issues of the short-lived journal.

The Millers registered objections over passages in "A Face of Stone" that repeated certain anti-Jewish characterizations of the Polish couple in the story. Literary critic Robert F. Marsh describes the contretemps between author and publisher:

Williams and Betty Miller argued in a heated way about the opening of "A Face of Stone," and Fred Miller agreed with his wife that the prejudice and apparent anti-Semitism of the first-person doctor-narrator would be too clearly associated with Williams, much to his detriment. Betty Miller suggested that Williams just omit the fourth paragraph of the story- "People like them belong in clinics...Just dumb oxen. Why the hell do they let them into the country? Half idiots at best." William listened graciously and complimented Betty Miller's on her critical abilities, and left the passage in.

Though the story appears in collections of Williams's works, it is unclear as to whether "A Face of Stone" appeared in any of the issues that Blast published.

Williams reported that he wrote the stories of Life Along the Passaic River (1938), among them " A Face of Stone", quickly, "at white heat" and "seldom revised them at all."

== Theme and style ==
"The use of a doctor-narrator is most striking in 'A Face of Stone'...In the opening description of the couple who seek his help, his irritation and prejudice are manifest: [The husband] was one of these fresh Jewish types you want to kill at sight, the presuming poor whose looks change the minute cash is mentioned... The tone is convincing: this narrator is a man whom the author thoroughly understands.—Literary critic Thomas R. Whitaker in "On the Ground" from William Carlos Williams (1968)

Critic Vivienne Koch places "A Face of Stone" among Williams' "most successful stories—in which a reversal of values is achieved by the slow impact of character upon character."

The visage of the doctor and his patients is a key device in the story. The harassed and exhausted doctor, presented at first as a "rude misanthrope," treats the poor immigrant Jewish family who visit his office with disdain, rationalizing his anti-semitism with vulgar stereotyping.

Williams presents the reader with an uncharacteristically "harsh and offensive" health professional, at odds with "the romantic vision of the healer-physician."

Another literary device appears when the doctor provides the 24-year-old wife, suffering from severe varicose veins, with "pills" to treat her condition. Gish writes: "The physician's recognition of the humanity he is seeing, manifested most clearly in the love of the husband for his wife, and, in turn, the love of the mother for her child —is by implication the pill the doctor must swallow, if he is to remain honest and faithful to his calling."

Literary critic Nasrullah Mambrol writes: "Because the doctor narrates the tale, the reader follows his process of discovery, so when he stops stereotyping the couple, the reader does so too. Williams once again successfully uses dialogue to convey character interaction." Gish provides this thematic summary:

The title takes one level of meaning from the poker-face wife, never smiling, never speaking - until the very end. But on another level, the 'face of stone' is the doctor's, an outward evidence, along with his insults and rebuffs, of his apparent heart of stone.

== Sources ==
- Gish, Robert F. 1989. William Carlos Williams: A Study of the Short Fiction. Twayne Publishers, Boston, Massassachusetts. G. K. Hall & Co. Gordon Weaver, General Editor. ISBN 0-8057-8307-5
- Koch Vivienne. 1950. "The Novels and Short Stories," in William Carlos Williams, New Directions Publishers, 1950, pp. 187–246.
- Mambrol, Nasrullah (June 26, 2020). "Analysis of William Carlos Williams's Stories". Literariness.org., (Kannur University).
- Marjorie Perloff. 1980. The Man Who Loved Women: The Medical Fictions of William Carlos Williams from Georgia Review 34, no. 4 (Winter 1980) in William Carlos Williams: A Study of the Short Fiction by Robert F. Gish, Twayne Publishers, Boston, Massachusetts. G. K. Hall & Co. Gordon Weaver, General Editor. pp. 182–196 ISBN 0-8057-8307-5
- Whitaker, Thomas R. 1968. "On the Ground" in William Carlos Williams (1968), Twayne Publishers. Boston, Massachusetts. pp. 97–118. ISBN 9780805708165
