= The Sailor's Son =

Short story by William Carlos Williams

- Short story by William Carlos Williams
- Country: United States
- Language: English

Publication
- Published in: The Knife of the Times and Other Stories
- Publication date: 1932

"The Sailor's Son" is a short story by William Carlos Williams, first published in The Knife of the Times and Other Stories (1932).

== Plot ==
Manuel, a young laborer, is working as a summer seasonal on Mrs. Cuthbertson's farm. He is engaged to Marge, who works in the city. He writes a letter, imploring her to visit him more often. Manuel's only regular visitor is a motorcycle-driving youth, the carousing "Sailor's Son" of the title, who spends weekends with him. Though Mrs. Cuthbertson is fully satisfied with Manuel's performance and docile demeanor, she finds his companion disreputable and presumptuous. She particularly resents the influence "The Kid" has over her employee. The two young men eat their meals together in Manuel's room and sleep in the same bed during the weekend visits.

Mrs. Cuthbertson determines to confirm what she suspects is an unnatural relationship. When she discovers the youths in the hay loft engaging in sex, she orders The Kid off her property and gives Manuel one week's notice to depart. When Manuel's fiancée arrives to retrieve him, she confronts Mrs. Cuthbertson, demanding to know why Manuel has been discharged. When Marge is informed of the homosexual liaison, she attributes little importance to the fact, declaring she fully intends to marry the boy. The two women nearly come to blows over the matter, and Manuel is fired despite begging Mrs. Cuthbertson to relent.

== Theme ==
"[T]he narrator takes no puritanical stand on so-called aberrant sexual liaisons. Although Margy [Manuel's fiancée] seems rather too nonchalant, it is her opinion that rings beyond the story—another commentary on Williams' live-and-let-live physician's acceptance of the human condition in all its forms and manifestations.—Literary critic Robert F. Gish in William Carlos Williams: A Study of the Short Fiction (1973)

Literary critic Vivienne Koch comments on the climax and denouement of the story:

In "The Sailor's Son," Williams handles the complementary situation to Lesbianism [addressed in the story "The Knife of the Times"], in the behavior of the docile and dependent Manuel. The plot is clever, although not in the fashionable way. The revelation at the end does not depend on a trick of withheld knowledge for its shock, but derives from the actual opening up of the meaning of Manuel's conduct before the outraged eyes of his employer, Mrs. Cuthbertson. When Margie, the woman whom Manuel plans to marry and who supports him in periods of unemployment, is told by Mrs. Cuthbertson that she has fired Manual because of her discovery of his homosexuality, Margie completely reverses the direction of Mrs. Cuthbertson's judgment as well as the actual events of the story.

Koch provides the final paragraph to support her analysis:

The boy is lonesome up here, said the fiancée. Why do you keep his friends away? I am engaged to marry him, I don't care what he does. Why should you worry? . . . Finally the fiancée grew abusive and Mrs. Cuthbertson losing her temper very nearly struck her. It was a wild moment. But in the end Manual was fired. And the [the fiancée] took him back to the city with her where she told him she would pay for a room until she could find work for him elsewhere.

== Sources ==
- Gish, Robert F. 1989. William Carlos Williams: A Study of the Short Fiction. Twayne Publishers, Boston, Massassachusetts. G. K. Hall & Co. Gordon Weaver, General Editor. ISBN 0-8057-8307-5
- Koch Vivienne. 1950. "The Novels and Short Stories," in William Carlos Williams, New Directions Publishers, 1950, pp. 187–246.
- Williams, Willam Carlos. 1961 The Farmers' Daughters: The Collected Stories of William Carlos Williams. New Directions Publishing, New York. pp. 21–25 ISBN 0-8112-0228-3
