= The Girl With a Pimply Face =

Short story

- Short story by William Carlos Williams
- Country: United States
- Language: English

Publication
- Published in: Blast: A Magazine of Proletarian Short Stories
- Publication date: 1934

"The Girl With a Pimply Face" is a short story by William Carlos Williams, first published in the literary journal Blast (1934). The story appeared in the 1938 collection Life Along the Passaic River issued by New Directions Publishers.

The story was among Williams' own favorites in the Passaic volume.

== Plot ==
A general medical practitioner is alerted by a local druggist that a Russian immigrant family has a very sick child: Can he visit them? The doctor complies, knowing that a medical colleague, who recently treated the family, condemned the parents as liars and alcoholics, and describing their teen-age daughter as "pimply-face little bitch." Even the doctor's own spouse expresses disapproval that her husband indulges in charity cases when these immigrants might apply for emergency relief.

The doctor initially mistakes his patient for the 16-year-old daughter who suffers from cosmetically disfiguring skin infections on her extremities and severe acne. Assessing her, he concludes that she is otherwise robust and healthy. When the actual patient is identified - the younger sister of the teen-ager - he discovers the infant is malnourished and suffers from diarrhea.

The doctor instantly takes a genuine and sympathetic interest in the older sister, who impresses him as a person of fine self-possession and innate intelligence, despite her coarse exterior. He provides treatment for her skin condition, and advises her to return to school, from which she admits she has been truant. When he visits the family again, he finds that the girl's skin condition has improved, and she is attending high school. Her infant sister has also recovered and will survive.

== Critical assessment ==
"The Girl With a Pimply Face", one of Williams "doctor stories." contrasts two sides of "institutional modern medicine," represented on one hand by the physician-narrator, and his cynical medical colleagues on the other. The narrator, while recognizing the backwardness of the poor Russian immigrant family he treats, discerns great potential in the character of their adolescent daughter, despite her blemished face and tough demeanor. The narrator's fellow medical colleges, on the contrary, disparage the girl and warn that the family will evade paying the doctor bill. Literary critic Vivienne Koch detects the thematic center of the story:

In "The Girl With the Pimply Face" there is a struggle between two sets of values. The doctor-narrator, who in reality is the hero of the piece..has fulfil[ed] his function as healer. He has cured, and his fulfillment is in his willingness to accept the reward proper to his function, a reward which lies entirely in the curing. It is this type of subtle revaluation of a crass popular morality, which reveals Williams as a writer with the greatest responsiveness to the questions of social ethics."

Literary critic Marjorie Perloff notes the "fine irony" that closes "The Girl With a Pimply Face." The doctor-narrator, despite never receiving his two-dollar house call payment, is abundantly compensated for his "charity," which gratifies and sustains him as a genuine health practitioner.

== Sources ==
- Gish, Robert F. 1989. William Carlos Williams: A Study of the Short Fiction. Twayne Publishers, Boston, Massassachusetts. G. K. Hall & Co.. Gordon Weaver, General Editor. ISBN 0-8057-8307-5
- Marjorie Perloff. 1980. The Man Who Loved Women: The Medical Fictions of William Carlos Williams from Georgia Review 34, no. 4 (Winter 1980) in William Carlos Williams: A Study of the Short Fiction by Robert F. Gish, Twayne Publishers, Boston, Massachusetts. G. K. Hall & Co.. Gordon Weaver, General Editor. pp. 182–196 ISBN 0-8057-8307-5
- Koch, Vivienne. 1950. "The Novels and Short Stories," in William Carlos Williams, New Directions Publishers, 1950, pp. 187–246.
