= The Use of Force =

Short story by William Carlos Williams

- Short story by William Carlos Williams
- Country: United States
- Language: English

Publication
- Published in: Life Along the Passaic River
- Publication date: 1938

"The Use of Force" is a short story by the American author William Carlos Williams. It was first published in his short story collection Life Along the Passaic River (1938); it is also available in The Doctor Stories (1984), a collection of Williams' fiction.

While most of Williams's short stories remain relatively unknown, "The Use of Force" has been widely anthologized since 1950, establishing it as part of the American literary canon. "The Use of Force" has been termed "Williams's most popular story."

== Plot summary ==
The story is narrated in the first-person confessional point-of-view by a rural physician, who is making a farmhouse call to tend to a sick girl. Concerned she may have diphtheria, the doctor decides to check her throat to confirm his suspicion. However, the girl adamantly refuses to cooperate, and the doctor eventually engages in a virtual assault on the child to restrain her and examine her throat using a spoon. The doctor finds that the girl, who was alerted at school that diphtheria might be fatal, had concealed the symptoms of the infection, and has in fact contracted the deadly pathogen.

== Analysis ==
The story is written without the use of quotation marks, and the dialogue is not distinguished from the narrator's comments. The story is rendered from the subjective point of view of the doctor and explores both his admiration for the child and disgust with the parents, and his guilty enjoyment of forcefully subduing the stubborn child in an attempt to acquire the throat sample. The overall theme of the story revolves around authority and resistance to power, and the doctor's unnerved feeling during the forceful encounter.

Author Robert F. Gish notes the underlying theme of implicit sexual violence in the short story: "Williams utilizes his familiar undertones of violent eroticism in 'The Use of Force'...Neither Williams nor his narrator is naive about the sexual implications of the episode." Gish writes:

The doctor knows the infection is the most powerful force in the equation of forces at work in the small, squalid room. Even the word "diphtheria" with all its forceful connotations is just a word. The force lies behind the word in the disease and in the will and anger and beauty of the girl's presence.

Medical doctor and literary critic Richard and Enid Rhodes Peschel cite a key passage from "The Use of Force" in which the doctor's effort to examine the 10-year-old girl Mathilda Olson for diphtheria, descends into a violent struggle of wills, in which he physically subdues her, described here by the doctor/narrator:

I grasped the child's head with my left hand and tried to get the wooden tongue depressor between her teeth. She fought, with clenched teeth, desperately! But now I had also grown furious—at a child. I tried to hold myself down but I couldn't...the worst of it was that I too had got beyond reason. I could have torn the child apart in my own fury and enjoyed it. It was a pleasure to attack her. My face was burning with it...

Critics Peschel and Peschel discover a thematic element of the story in its denouement:

Williams's [the narrator's] hatred toward his pediatric patient does not remain. First, he has conquered this seemingly unconquerable creature. Second, though he has vented his anger on her, he has the satisfaction of finding her unhealthy. Thus the negative implication of an act potentially comparable to rape (the story's title alerts us to this hideous violation) are safely dissipated. Third, his feelings about her are ambivalent...We sense that his doctor-narrator likes this patient's wildness, willfulness and stubbornness...Perhaps it reminds him of something fierce and persistent in himself: of that very fierceness and persistency by which he eventually conquered his patient...

== Sources ==
- Gish, Robert F. 1989. William Carlos Williams: A Study of the Short Fiction. Twayne Publishers, Boston, Massachusetts. Gordon Weaver, General Editor. G. K. Hall & Co. ISBN 0-8057-8307-5
- Peschel, Richard E. and Peschel, Enid Rhodes. 1984. When a Doctor Hates a Patient: Case Histories, Literary Histories from the Michigan Quarterly Review, 23 no. 3 (Summer 1984) in William Carlos Williams: A Study of the Short Fiction by Robert F. Gish, Twayne Publishers, Boston, Massachusetts. Gordon Weaver, General Editor. pp. 152–158 ISBN 0-8057-8307-5
- Slate, J. E. 1968. William Carlos Williams and the Modern Short Story from The Southern Review 4, no. 3 (July 1968) in William Carlos Williams: A Study of the Short Fiction, by Robert F. Gish. Twayne Publishers, Boston, Massachusetts. Gordon Weaver, General Editor. G. K. Hall & Co. pp. 160–169 ISBN 0-8057-8307-5
