= The Knife of the Times =

Short story by William Carlos Williams

- Short story by William Carlos Williams
- Country: United States
- Language: English

Publication
- Published in: The Knife of the Times and Other Stories
- Publication date: 1932

"The Knife of the Times" is a short story by William Carlos Williams first published in the collection The Knife of the Times and Other Stories (1932) by New Directions Publishing.

== Plot ==
As girls, Ethel and Maura, form an intimate bond. As young adults they marry men and raise families, but remain in touch with one another and share the details of their personal lives. Ethel resides in Harrisburg, Pennsylvania; Maura in New York City. These middle-class women are quite open with their husbands about their platonic affection for one another.

Ethel has six children, but finds that child-rearing is unfulfilling. Several years pass after her last birth, and Ethel's letters to Maura become more intimate, more urgent in tone: she frankly declares her love for Maura. Maura is disturbed by these declarations, but admits to herself that these missives exceed those she had wished to receive from ardent male lovers in her youth. She deems it prudent to conceal these communications from her spouse, fearing complications. Ethel's letters persist, now expressing openly her sexual desire for Maura in the most tender and explicit terms.

Twenty years pass, and both of the women's children are grown. Ethel contacts Maura, asking her to rendezvous with her in New York City. Will she come? Ethel adds that she will be accompanied by her elderly mother. At the railway station, the woman embrace affectionately. Maura expresses a desire to relieve herself, and Ethel escorts her to a public restroom. As Maura enters the stall, Ethel quickly accompanies her inside, despite Maura's surprised protest. Closing the door, Ethel takes Maura in her arms and, weeping, begins to adore her, smothering her with kisses and caresses. Maura wishes to appease her, but is overwhelmed and uncertain how to respond under the circumstances. She is particularly concerned they will be discovered. The woman rejoined the mother for lunch.

On her way back home alone, Maura reflects on her encounter. She recalls Ethel's seductive invitation to visit her for a week or more. Maura thinks, why not?

== Critical assessment and theme ==
"The collection The Knife of the Times and Other Stories (1932) deals with deal sexual relationships that violate social norms: lesbianism in the title story, adultery in "A Visit to the Fair" and "Hands across the Sea," and bisexuality in "The Sailor's Son." Each subject is figuratively a knife of the times, a painful fact of the heterogeneous life in Depression-era America that challenges social definitions of love and family and upsets preconceptions of normalcy." James G. Watson in "The American Short Story: 1930-1945" (1984)

Literary critic James G. Watson asks the following rhetorical question regarding the story's theme and William's approach to literary art:

Knife-like itself, the story cuts away the easy affirmations and surface assumptions of the times to pose the same question that Maura asks herself. Given the importance of life in its essential qualities—not stereotypes—why not be true to the imperatives of intimacy, in life and in art?"

Biographer Robert F. Gish places the story into the larger context of homosexuality as a topic in 20th century literature:

One "knife" in the story is the knife of long-repressed sexual desire and desire to be free of society's expectations and conventions. "Why not" as Maura announces it, is at once a cry of liberation and a leveling of self-restraint in the face of larger instincts."

Gish adds that "The Knife of the Times" though "quaint' by today's standards "allows the reader insights into just how far in the history of the short story the freedom to deal with the issue of homosexuality has extended. In this sense Williams deserves as much credit as E. M. Forster and others whose homosexual stories were by and large only published posthumously."

== Sources ==
- Gish, Robert F. (1989). William Carlos Williams: A Study of the Short Fiction. Boston, Massachusetts: Twayne Publishers,G. K. Hall & Co.
- Watson, James G. 1984. "The American Short Story: 1930-1945" in The American Short Story, 1900-1945: A Critical History, G. K. Hall & Co., 1984, pp. 103–46.ISBN 978-0805793536 Accessed at https://www.enotes.com/topics/william-carlos-williams/critical-essays/williams-william-carlos Retrieved 19 July 2023.
- Williams, Willam Carlos. 1961 The Farmers' Daughters: The Collected Stories of William Carlos Williams. New Directions Publishing, New York. pp. 3–6 ISBN 0-8112-0228-3
