= Journey to Love =

Journey to Love may refer to:

- Journey to Love (album), a 1975 album by Stanley Clarke
- Journey to Love (poetry collection), a 1955 book by William Carlos Williams
