= Spring and Fall =

Spring and Fall may refer to:

- "Spring and Fall" (poem), a poem by Gerard Manley Hopkins
- Spring and Fall (album), a 2012 album by Paul Kelly
- Spring & Fall, an Australian anthology television series

== See also ==
- Spring and All
