= Life Along the Passaic River =

Literature collection by William Carlos Williams

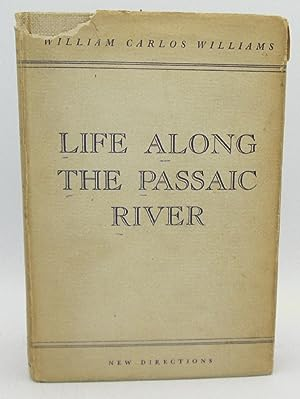
- First edition cover
- Language: English
- Genre: Short story collection
- Publisher: New Directions Publishing
- Publication date: 1938
- Publication place: United States
- Media type: Print (hardcover)
- Pages: 201
- OCLC: 1318543

Life Along the Passaic River is a collection of 18 works of short fiction by William Carlos Williams published in 1938 by New Directions Publishers. The stories were also collected in Make Light of It: Collected Stories of William Carlos Williams (1950) and The Farmers' Daughters: The Collected Short Stories of William Carlos Williams. (1961)

The volume includes some of Williams' best-regarded stories, and he personally regarded "The Girl With a Pimply Face" and "Jean Beicke" among his favorites.

After completing the short stories that comprise the Passaic River anthology, Williams shifted away from this literary form.

== Stories ==
- "Life Along the Passaic"
- "The Girl With a Pimply Face"
- "The Use of Force"
- "A Night in June"
- "The Dawn of Another Day"
- "Jean Beicke"
- "A Face of Stone"
- "To Fall Asleep"
- "The Cold World"
- "Four Bottles of Beer"
- "At the Front"
- "The Right Thing"
- "Second Marriage"
- "A Difficult Man"
- "Danse Pseudomacabre"
- "The Venus"
- "Under the Greenwood Tree"
- "World's End"

== Critical assessment ==
Life Along the Passaic River is the second of Williams' two major contributions to the short story form. The unnamed first-person narrator, like Williams himself, is a general practitioner of medicine. He serves the mostly low-income immigrant population who in work in the industrialized regions of the Passaic River valley, set in New Jersey during the Great Depression.

Calling Passaic "Williams' strongest collection of stories," literary critic Vivienne Koch provides this overview of the anthology:

In Life Along the Passaic River, Williams confines himself almost entirely to the people who live along its banks. The collection, without being "regional," builds up a solid feeling of community, of place. Written during the Depression years, they reflect some of the curious dislocations in caste and character precipitated by the times. The Poles, the Italian mothers, the wild children, the unemployed, the furtive adolescents, all these aspects of the life of a small industrial town in America are explored with that warm authenticity of observation which sheds clarity and illumination into the disordered areas of the human soul.

"As a writer, I have been a physician, and as a physician a writer."—William Carlos Williams in the Foreword to his Autobiography (1951)

.Koch adds that "Many of the stories, like those of Chekhov's, have quite patently grown out of Williams' medical experience."

Biographer Linda Welshimer Wagner notes that Passaic marks a significant development in Williams' literary handling of his subjects:

The tone of the collection as a whole, differs radically from that of The Knife of the Times and Other Stories (1932). "The Colored Girls of Passenack" is one of the few stories in the earlier collection that do not berate the culture of the 1930's. Life Along the Passaic River, for the most part, uses understanding rather than vindication as its dominant tone...the stories illustrate the bravery or humor or solidarity of that life...This is truly the doctor's view of his people. The tone is lightly ironic, almost sardonic..."

Wagner considers the Passaic anthology "Williams' strongest collection of stories" that comprise "the doctor-oriented narratives that are Williams' forte."

Critic Robert F. Gish writes: "In Passaic, more so than in any other collection of his stories, memorable characters come to the forefront as living people, people with names and desires that at once typify and transcend their kind...Part of the cynicism and part of the hostility expressed here by Williams and his personae is due to the inequalities in class, education, income, intelligence and sensibilities...hard times are recorded on more than one level. Williams's own middle-class respectability and security adds to the poignancy of the disparities between class and economic status of the individuals living along the Passaic."

== Sources ==
- Gish, Robert F. 1989. William Carlos Williams: A Study of the Short Fiction. Twayne Publishers, Boston, Massassachusetts. G. K. Hall & Co. Gordon Weaver, General Editor. ISBN 0-8057-8307-5
- Vivienne Koch. 1950. "The Novels and Short Stories," in William Carlos Williams, New Directions Publishing, 1950, pp. 187–246.
- Marjorie Perloff. 1980. The Man Who Loved Women: The Medical Fictions of William Carlos Williams from Georgia Review 34, no. 4 (Winter 1980) in William Carlos Williams: A Study of the Short Fiction by Robert F. Gish, Twayne Publishers, Boston, Massachusetts. G. K. Hall & Co. Gordon Weaver, General Editor. pp. 182–196 ISBN 0-8057-8307-5
- Rahv, Philip (March 1938). "Dr. Williams in His Short Stories". Partisan Review, in Image and Idea: Twenty Essays on Literary Themes, New Directions, 1957, pp. 155-58.
- Wagner, Linda Welshimer (1970). The Prose of William Carlos Williams. Middletown, Connecticut: Wesleyan University Press. p. 244. ISBN 978-0819540263.
