= Laura Dean (choreographer) =

Laura Dean (born December 3, 1945) is an American dancer, choreographer and composer. She is known for her collaborations with Steve Reich, a number of commissioned works for the Joffrey Ballet, and works for her own dance companies. Dean's earliest works were marked by a minimalist approach and an affinity for spinning; her later work saw more use of traditional dance methods.

== Awards ==
Dean is the recipient of awards including the 2008 Samuel H. Scripps American Dance Festival Award for Lifetime Achievement in Dance. She has also received a "Bessie" New York Dance and Performance Award for her work with composer Steve Reich (1986). Dean has been awarded two John Simon Guggenheim Fellowships for choreography (1976 and 1981), the Montgomery Fellowship from Dartmouth College(1986), the Dance Magazine Award (1982), the Smithsonian Institution Certificate of Appreciation (1975), Harvard University's Certificate of Appreciation (1991), New York City Commission of the Status of Women Special Recognition Award (1984), the ABSOLUT Award for Artistic Achievement (1993), the Staten Island Arts Council Award for Outstanding Achievement (1988), the Lester Horton Award for Music for Dance (1994), the Brandeis Creative Arts Award for Extraordinary Artistic Achievement in Dance (1986) and an Honorary Doctorate from The College of Staten Island/The City University of New York (2001).

Laura Dean was awarded The Millennium Grant from The National Endowment for the Arts for her work with The American Indian Dance Theatre. Ms. Dean has received The National Repertory Dance Grant from The National Endowment on the Arts and The Meet the Composer Grant for her work with The Aman Folk Ensemble. Her company has received funding from The New York State Council on the Arts, The North Carolina State Arts Council, 27 grants from The National Endowment for the Arts, ATT Foundation, The Jerome Foundation, The New York Foundation, The Jerome Robbins Foundation and Trust, The Sherman Foundation, The Lila Wallace Reader's Digest Fund, The Rockefeller Foundation, The Philip Morris Foundation, and The Mary Duke Biddle Foundation.

== Career ==
Laura Dean has composed thirty music scores and choreographed one hundred and nine dance works. This includes the choreography for her own dance and music company as well as for ballet companies, ice skating companies, other modern dance companies, student dance companies, The American Indian Dance Theatre and The Aman Folk Ensemble. She has choreographed nine works to the music of Steve Reich with the music played live by Steve Reich and Musicians to five of the works. Laura Dean Dancers and Musicians commissioned Steve Reich for the music Sextet for Laura Dean's dance IMPACT. Steve Reich and Laura Dean were awarded a Bessie/New York Dance and Performance Award for IMPACT/SEXTET in 1986.

Laura Dean's company has performed in the United States, Canada, New Zealand, Indonesia, India, Europe and Eastern Europe. Works for her company have been commissioned by Het Muziektheater, The Brooklyn Academy of Music, The American Dance Festival, Walker Art Center, The Holland Festival, The Avignon Festival, Dartmouth College, The Styrian Autumn Festival, Graz, Austria.

Dean has created ballets including two works for The Royal Danish Ballet with the first work DELTA with a commissioned orchestral score from the composer Gary Brooker of Procol Harum, The New York City Ballet SPACE with an orchestral score The Four Sections by Steve Reich, eight ballets for The Joffrey Ballet including CREATIVE FORCE with a commissioned score Ray One by John Zeretzke. CREATIVE FORCE was seen in the Robert Altman film The Company. CREATIVE FORCE, as part of the film, was nominated for an American Choreography Award.

Dean stopped choreographing and writing music in 2001. As of 2009, Laura Dean, the choreographer/composer, is no longer arranging and allowing restaging/reconstruction projects of her dance and music works. Dean does not allow the teaching of her choreography or music in classes, lectures, panels or in any way whatsoever.

The archive of Laura Dean's Papers is located at the David M. Rubenstein Rare Book & Manuscript Library at Duke University and includes photographic prints, negatives, slides, clippings, programs, VHS videotapes, and an audio cassette.
