= Spring and All =

Book by William Carlos Williams

First edition

Spring and All is a volume of poems by William Carlos Williams, first published in 1923 by Robert McAlmon's Contact Publishing Co.

== Overview ==
Spring and All is a hybrid work consisting of alternating sections of prose and free verse. It might best be understood as a manifesto of the imagination. The prose passages are a dramatic, energetic and often cryptic series of statements about the ways in which language can be renewed in such a way that it does not describe the world but recreates it. These passages are interspersed with poems that demonstrate this recreation in both their form and content. The two most famous sections of Spring and All are poems I and XXII. The former, which opens "By the road to the contagious hospital", is commonly known by the title "Spring and All", and the latter is generally known as "The Red Wheelbarrow".

== Publication, analysis and response ==
Spring and All was printed in an edition of 300 by Maurice Darantière. Darantière was a printer based in Dijon, France, who had printed the first edition of James Joyce's Ulysses in 1922, and who also printed a range of other significant modernist works. Williams himself said the book drew little attention at the time of publication. Williams biographer Paul Mariani notes: "...most of the copies that were sent to America were simply confiscated by American customs officials as foreign stuff and therefore probably salacious and destructive of American morals. In effect, Spring and All all but disappeared as a cohesive text until its republication nearly ten years after Williams’ death." Some sources indicate that half of the original print run was confiscated by the U.S. Post Office.

Until July 2011, when New Directions Publishing issued a facsimile edition, it was never again published as a free-standing book, though the poems and some of the prose sections were reprinted in various combinations through the years. In 1970, Spring and All appeared in its entirety, along with several other short works, in New Directions volume Imaginations, which is still in print. Spring and All is also included in the first volume of Williams's Collected Poems.

According to Williams biographer James E. Breslin, T. S. Eliot's poem The Waste Land which appeared in 1922, was a major influence on Williams and Spring and All. In The Autobiography, Williams would later write, "I felt at once that The Waste Land had set me back twenty years and I'm sure it did. Critically, Eliot returned us to the classroom just at the moment when I felt we were on a point to escape to matters much closer to the essence of a new art form itself—rooted in the locality which should give it fruit". Spring and All viewed the same post-World War I landscape as did Eliot but interpreted it differently. Williams "saw his poetic task was to affirm the self-reliant, sympathetic consciousness of Whitman in a broken industrialized world", Williams critic Donald A. Stauffer noted. "But unlike Eliot, who responded negatively to the harsh realities of this world, Williams saw his task as breaking through restrictions and generating new growth."

Spring and All was cited as one of the 88 "Books That Shaped America" by the Library of Congress in 2012. In its statement on the impact of the work, The Library of Congress notes: "A practicing physician for more than 40 years, William Carlos Williams became an experimenter, innovator and revolutionary figure in American poetry. In reaction against the rigid, rhyming format of 19th-century poets, Williams, his friend Ezra Pound and other early-20th-century poets formed the core of what became known as the 'Imagist' movement. Their poetry focused on verbal pictures and moments of revealed truth, rather than a structure of consecutive events or thoughts and was expressed in free verse rather than rhyme."

== See also ==
- "The Red Wheelbarrow"
