= Sextet (Reich) =

1984 composition by Steve Reich

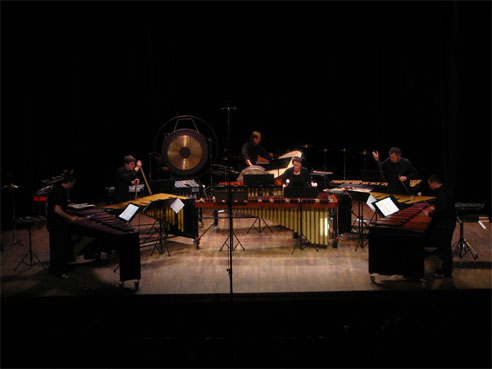
The Percussions-Claviers de Lyon ensemble performing Sextet, Salle Rameau, Lyon, France, November 6, 2006

Sextet is a composition by American composer Steve Reich. The piece was written and first performed in 1984, and slightly revised in 1985.

== Overview ==
As the title indicates, it is written for an ensemble of six: four percussionists and two keyboardists. The percussionists play (at various times) three marimbas, two vibraphones, two bass drums, crotales, sticks, and tam-tam. Two percussionists double on piano during the opening "Pulse" section. The keyboardists play both pianos and synthesizers set to an electric organ sound.

The piece is broken into five movements and, like many other Reich compositions, Sextet has an arch form: A-B-C-B-A. The paired movements share a tempo and a particular cycle of chords. These cycles use dominant chords with added tones to give it a darker, more chromatic sound, much like Reich's previous piece, The Desert Music.

A typical performance lasts about 26 minutes.

== Analysis ==
Sextet plays with two aspects of music. First, it tries to overcome natural acoustic limitations of percussion instruments. Vibraphones are normally incapable of sustaining pitches at the same volume like wind or string instruments; they act much like a piano, where notes are struck and then allowed to ring, eventually decaying. To counter this limitation, Reich employs the extended technique of bowing of the bars with a bass bow. A similar limitation in the percussion section is countered by the use of the synthesizers. At the time Sextet was written, keyboard percussion instruments capable of reaching into the bass range (5-octave marimbas or bass marimbas) were not widely available. To give the work more depth in the lower pitch ranges, the bass drum is employed with doubling from the pianos or synthesizers.

Second, the piece plays with ambiguity. In the third movement, a basic 12-beat pattern is ambiguous between a division into three and into four. In other parts of the piece, the line that was the melody becomes the accompaniment, even though the actual notes do not change.

== Versions ==
The piece was co-commissioned by the Laura Dean Dancers and Musicians and the French government. An incomplete version premiered in December 1984, in Paris. It was reworked in early 1985 and received its American premiere in New York on October 31, 1985 during the Next Wave Festival at the Brooklyn Academy of Music as the stage music for Laura Dean's Impact. It then was recorded by Steve Reich's ensemble on Nonesuch Records in 1986.
