= The Desert Music and Other Poems =

Book by William Carlos Williams

- First edition
- Author: William Carlos Williams
- Language: English
- Genre: Poetry
- Publisher: Random House
- Publication date: 1954

The Desert Music and Other Poems was a 1954 Random House book collecting 1949-54 poems by the American modernist poet/writer William Carlos Williams. It is now collected, along with Pictures from Brueghel and Other Poems (1962) and Journey to Love (1955), in the New Directions paperback Pictures from Brueghel and other poems by William Carlos Williams: Collected Poems 1950-1962.

The book was a Finalist for the National Book Awards 1955 for Poetry.

Desert Music was written after Williams recovered from a stroke in 1952.

Kenneth Rexroth called the title poem "an explicit statement of the irreducible humaneness of the human being."

== Table of Contents ==
- "The Descent"
- "To Daphne and Virginia"
- "The Orchestra"
- "For Eleanor and Bill Monahan"
- "To a Dog Injured in the Street"
- "The Yellow Flower"
- "The Host"
- "Deep Religious Faith"
- "The Mental Hospital Garden"
- "The Artist"
- "Theocritus: Idyl I"
- "The Desert Music" set on the El Paso / Juarez border.

Except for the title poem, all the pieces here are in triadic stanza form (with slight exceptions), as in the opening of "The Descent":

The descent beckons
as the ascent beckoned.
Memory is a kind
of accomplishment,
a sort of renewal
even

Parts of "Theocritus: Idyl I" and "The Orchestra" were used in The Desert Music, a composition for chorus and orchestra or voices and ensemble by Minimalist composer Steve Reich in 1984.
