= The Desert Music =

1983 composition by Steve Reich

- by Steve Reich
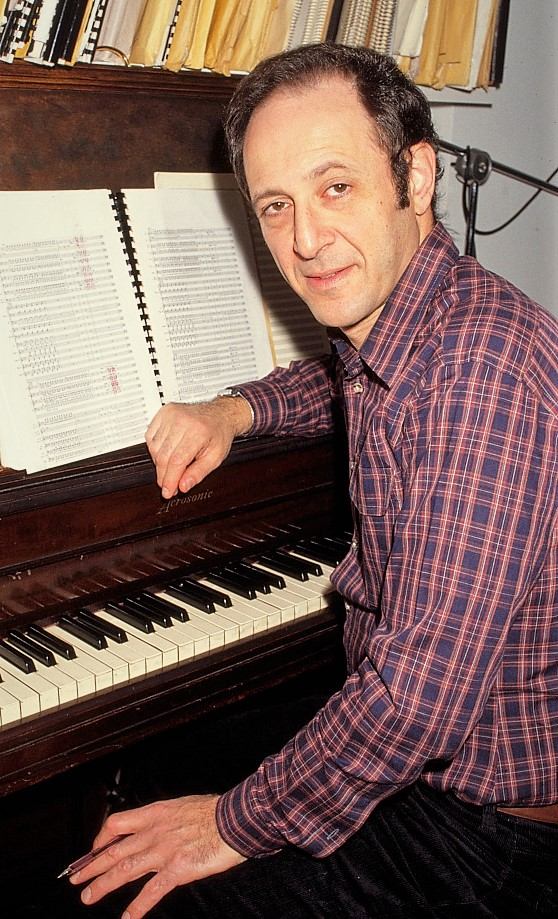
- Reich in the early 1980s
- Period: Minimalism
- Commissioned by: Westdeutscher Rundfunk and Brooklyn Academy of Music
- Text: The Desert Music and Other Poems by William Carlos Williams
- Composed: 1983
- Publisher: Boosey and Hawkes
- Duration: 50 minutes
- Movements: Five

Premiere
- Date: March 17 1984
- Location: Cologne
- Conductor: Péter Eötvös
- Performers: West German Radio Choir Cologne and Cologne Radio Symphony Orchestra

The Desert Music is a cantata for voices and orchestra written from September 1982 to December 1983 by American minimalist composer Steve Reich, setting texts by William Carlos Williams. Its title is derived from Williams' poetry anthology, The Desert Music and Other Poems. The composition consists of five movements, with a duration of about 46 minutes. In both its arrangement of thematic material and use of tempi, the piece is in a characteristic arch form (ABCBA).

The Desert Music received its world premiere on March 17, 1984 in Cologne.

== Orchestration ==
The piece is scored for a chorus of 27 voices: nine sopranos, and six each of altos, tenors and basses.

The orchestra calls for:

- 4 flutes (doubling on 3 piccolos), 4 oboes (doubling on 3 cor anglais), 4 B♭ clarinets (doubling on 3 B♭ bass clarinets), 4 bassoons (doubling on 1 contrabassoon)
- 4 horns, 4 trumpets (doubling on 1 optional piccolo trumpet), 2 trombones, bass trombone, tuba.
- 2 timpani players (doubling rototoms); 7 percussionists (including 2 players on marimba; 2 players on vibraphone; 2 players on xylophones, doubling glockenspiels; maracas paired with sticks; 2 bass drums, and medium tam-tam).
- 2 pianos, played by four musicians (doubling 3 synthesizers)
- The strings (12-12-9-9-6) are broken into three sections of (4-4-3-3-2) seated by their section with the first set of 16 players stage right, the next 16 center stage, and the last 16 stage left

There is also a reduced orchestration, prepared by Reich himself, for a chorus of 10 voices (3 sopranos, 3 altos, 2 tenors, 2 basses), accompanied by:

- 4 flutes (doubling on 3 piccolos)
- 2 horns, 2 trumpets, 3 trombones (all brass optional)
- 4 pianos, all doubling synthesizer
- 12 solo strings, broken into three quartets, plus one or two basses

No reductions are made in the percussion.

== Music ==
The Desert Music's text is taken from passages from poems in William Carlos Williams's anthology of the same name. The work is in five movements and lasts around 50 minutes. Percussion is heard throughout the work playing in complex and changing metres such as 5/8 and 6/3.

1. Fast tempo ( = 192 in 4/4 time)
2. Moderate tempo
3. A. Slow tempo
  B. Moderate tempo
  C. Slow tempo
4. Moderate tempo
5. Fast tempo

The tempi between two sections are related by a ratio of 3:2, introduced at the end of each section by either tuplet or dotted rhythms, respectively: I and V have 192 beats per minute; II, IIIB, and IV have 128i; and IIIA and C have 85.

Sections I and V have the same harmonic structure. Sections II and IV have both the same harmonic structure and the same words, and likewise Sections IIIA and IIIC.

== Relation to other Reich pieces ==
The piece opens similarly to many of Reich's other works: a piano or mallet instrument pulsing on the beat, with another piano or marimba soon fading in on the offbeats (Music for 18 Musicians, Sextet, Three Movements for Orchestra). Also characteristic of several of Reich's pieces, such as New York Counterpoint, Electric Counterpoint, Sextet, Music for 18 Musicians, Three Movements for Orchestra, the exposition of the pulse is followed by pulsed notes in the choir and orchestra fading in and out over the course of a chord progression. Also, the first movement prominently features a repeated rhythm found in several of the aforementioned works (in The Desert Music, however, the fourth and fifth note are tied together):

Twice in Section IIIC, the strings begin playing a slightly modified section from Reich's New York Counterpoint.

== Recordings ==
The Desert Music has been recorded several times, including the in following media:

- The Desert Music (1985, Nonesuch Records, 979 101-2, OCLC 13999172), conducted by Michael Tilson Thomas
- The Desert Music (1996, BBC Radio Classics, 15656 91692, OCLC 37998267), conducted by Peter Eötvös
- Tehillim / The Desert Music (2002, Cantaloupe Music, CA21009, OCLC 50791159), revised chamber version, conducted by Alan Pierson
- The Desert Music (Live) (2003, Ornorm Production, ORNORM 1, OCLC 255848271), conducted by Dominique Debart
- Reich (2011, Chandos, CHSA 5091, OCLC 727712100), conducted by Kristjan Järvi
- Spirit Of The Wild; The Desert Music (2019, ABC Classics, 4817899, OCLC 1089931654), conducted by David Robertson
- Joe Hisaishi Conducts (2025, Deutsche Grammophon, 516548000, OCLC 1527921592), conducted by Joe Hisaishi

== Sources ==
- Reich, Steve (2002). "The Desert Music–Steve Reich in Conversation with Jonathan Cott (1984)". In Reich, Steve; Hillier, Paul (eds.). Writings on Music, 1965-2000. Oxford: Oxford University Press. pp. 127–131. ISBN 978-0-19-515115-2.
- Koch, Gerhard R. (1984). "Reich's 'The Desert Music'". Tempo (149). Cambridge University Press: 44–46. ISSN 0040-2982. JSTOR 945086.
- Coroniti, Joseph A. (1989). "Scoring the "Absolute Rhythm" of William Carlos Williams: Steve Reich's "The Desert Music"". William Carlos Williams Review. 15 (2). Penn State University Press: 36–48. ISSN 0196-6286. JSTOR 24564908.
- Reich, Steve (1985). The Desert Music (Media notes). Nonesuch Records. 979 101-2.
