= Make Light of It: Collected Stories of William Carlos Williams =

William Carlos Williams short story collection

- Title page
- Author: William Carlos Williams
- Language: English
- Genre: Short story collection
- Publisher: Random House
- Publication date: 1950
- Publication place: United States
- Media type: Print (hardcover)
- Pages: 342
- ISBN: 978-1137004772

Make Light of It: Collected Stories of William Carlos Williams is a collection of short fiction by William Carlos Williams published in 1950 by Random House. The volume is an amalgamation of the stories previously included in The Knife of the Times and Other Stories (1932) and Life Along the Passaic River (1938), as well as 20 stories first collected in this volume and presented under the heading Beer and Cold Cuts.

== Stories ==
=== Previously collected stories in the volume ===
- The Knife of the Times and Other Stories (1932)
- Life Along the Passaic River (1938)

=== Beer and Cold Cuts ===
- "The Burden of Loneliness"
- "Above the River"
- "No Place for a Woman"
- "The Paid Nurse"
- "Frankie and the Newspaperman"
- "Ancient Gentility"
- "The Final Embarrassment"
- "The Round the World Fliers"
- "The Redhead"
- "Verbal Transcription: 6 A.M."
- "The Insane"
- "The Good Old Days"
- "A Good-Natured Sloth"
- "A Lucky Break"
- "The Pace That Kills"
- "Lena"
- "Country Rain"
- "Inquest"
- "Comedy Entombed: 1930"
- "The Zoo"

Literary critic Robert F. Gish describes Beer and Cold Cuts as "working man and ethnic stories which is not so much a separate volume of stories but...twenty common or proletarian stories," adding that they had been written "for the most part before 1950." Literary critic Linda Welshimer Wagner writes: "Beer and Cold Cuts, the third group of stories Williams included in his 1950 collection, contains several major pieces and a number of fragmentary glimpses of the people he loved."

== Style and structure ==
"Make Light of It includes many brief sketches that are important mainly as reflecting Williams' search for the illuminating detail and the cadences of live speech. But several stories are more difficult contrapuntal structures, rendering a hitherto unrecognized order. Wagner remarks on the relevance of Williams as a 20th Century short story writer:

Denis Donoghue feels that "Williams' stories will wear better than his poems, because the stories keep him rooted in the particular incident" [from Connoisseurs of Chaos, 1965]. Many modern writers, ranging from Flannery O'Connor to Robert Creeley, share this view. The apparently effortless telling, the informal (and often unresolved) plot, the emphasis on character presented through salient details, and above all, the reliance on dialogue—these trademarks of a Williams' story occur repeatedly in contemporary writing...

== Sources ==
- Gish, Robert F. 1989. William Carlos Williams: A Study of the Short Fiction. Twayne Publishers, Boston, Massassachusetts. G. K. Hall & Co. Gordon Weaver, General Editor. ISBN 0-8057-8307-5
- Wagner, Linda Welshimer (1970). The Prose of William Carlos Williams. Middletown, Connecticut: Wesleyan University Press. p. 244. ISBN 978-0819540263.
- Whitaker, Thomas R. 1968. "On the Ground" in William Carlos Williams, Twayne Publishers. Boston, Massachusetts. pp. 97–118. ISBN 9780805708165 in e-notes, https://www.enotes.com/topics/william-carlos-williams/critical-essays/williams-william-carlos, Retrieved 1 September 2023.
