= Journey to Love (poetry collection) =

Book by William Carlos Williams

- Author: William Carlos Williams
- Genre: Poetry
- Publisher: Random House
- Publication date: 1955

Journey to Love was a 1955 Random House book by the American modernist poet/writer William Carlos Williams. He dedicated it to his wife. All of the poems are in triadic stanza form, sometimes "with a short fourth line to fill out the measure."

Journey to Love is now collected, along with Pictures from Brueghel and Other Poems (1962) and The Desert Music and Other Poems (1954), in the New Directions paperback Pictures from Brueghel and other poems by William Carlos Williams: Collected Poems 1950-1962.

== Table of contents ==
- "A Negro Woman"
- "The Ivy Crown"
- "View by Color Photography on a Commercial Calendar"
- "The Sparrow"
- "The King!"
- "The Lady Speaks"
- "Tribute to the Painters"
- "To a Man Dying on His Feet"
- "Come on!"
- "The Pink Locust"
- "Classic Picture"
- "Address"
- "The Drunk and the Sailor"
- "A Smiling Dane"
- "Shadows"
- "Asphodel, That Greeny Flower"

== "Asphodel, That Greeny Flower" ==
The crowning poem of the collection is "Asphodel, That Greeny Flower," about which entire books have been written. By far the longest piece in the volume at thirty pages, this four-part pastoral love poem was originally envisioned as the fifth book of Paterson. He began writing it in 1952 in the midst of health problems—physical (a heart attack and multiple strokes that left him, among other things, with periods of near-blindness and partially paralyzed, able to type only with one hand) and mental (depression). Facing death, he confessed old adulteries to his wife. In this context, he wrote "one of the most beautiful affirmations of the power of love in—and against—the nuclear age, and one of the few memorable love poems in English written not for a mistress but for a wife." He reviews their life together and states that her forgiveness of him has revived him.

Although hardly the most profound thing in the poem, one section is much quoted:

It is difficult

to get the news from poems

yet men die miserably every day

for lack

of what is found there.

A different excerpt from "Asphodel, That Greeny Flower" was used in the fifth and final movement of The Desert Music, a composition for chorus and orchestra or voices and ensemble by Minimalist composer Steve Reich in 1984.
