= Imaginations (William Carlos Williams book) =

Book by William Carlos Williams

Imaginations is a 1970 collection of five previously published early works by William Carlos Williams, comprising Kora in Hell, Spring and All, The Descent of Winter, The Great American Novel, and A Novelette & Other Prose.
