= Pictures from Brueghel and Other Poems =

Book by William Carlos Williams

- Author: William Carlos Williams
- Publisher: New Directions Publishing
- Publication date: 1962

Pictures from Brueghel and Other Poems is a 1962 book of poems by the American modernist poet/writer William Carlos Williams. It was Williams's final book, for which he posthumously won the Pulitzer Prize for Poetry in 1963. Two previously published collections of poetry are included: The Desert Music and Other Poems from 1954 and Journey to Love from 1955.

Pieter Brueghel the Elder was a Flemish painter (born c. 1525–1530, died 1569), famous for pictures of peasant life. This book opens with the title cycle of ten poems (the last poem is in three parts), each based on a Brueghel painting.
