= This Is Just to Say =

1934 poem by William Carlos Williams

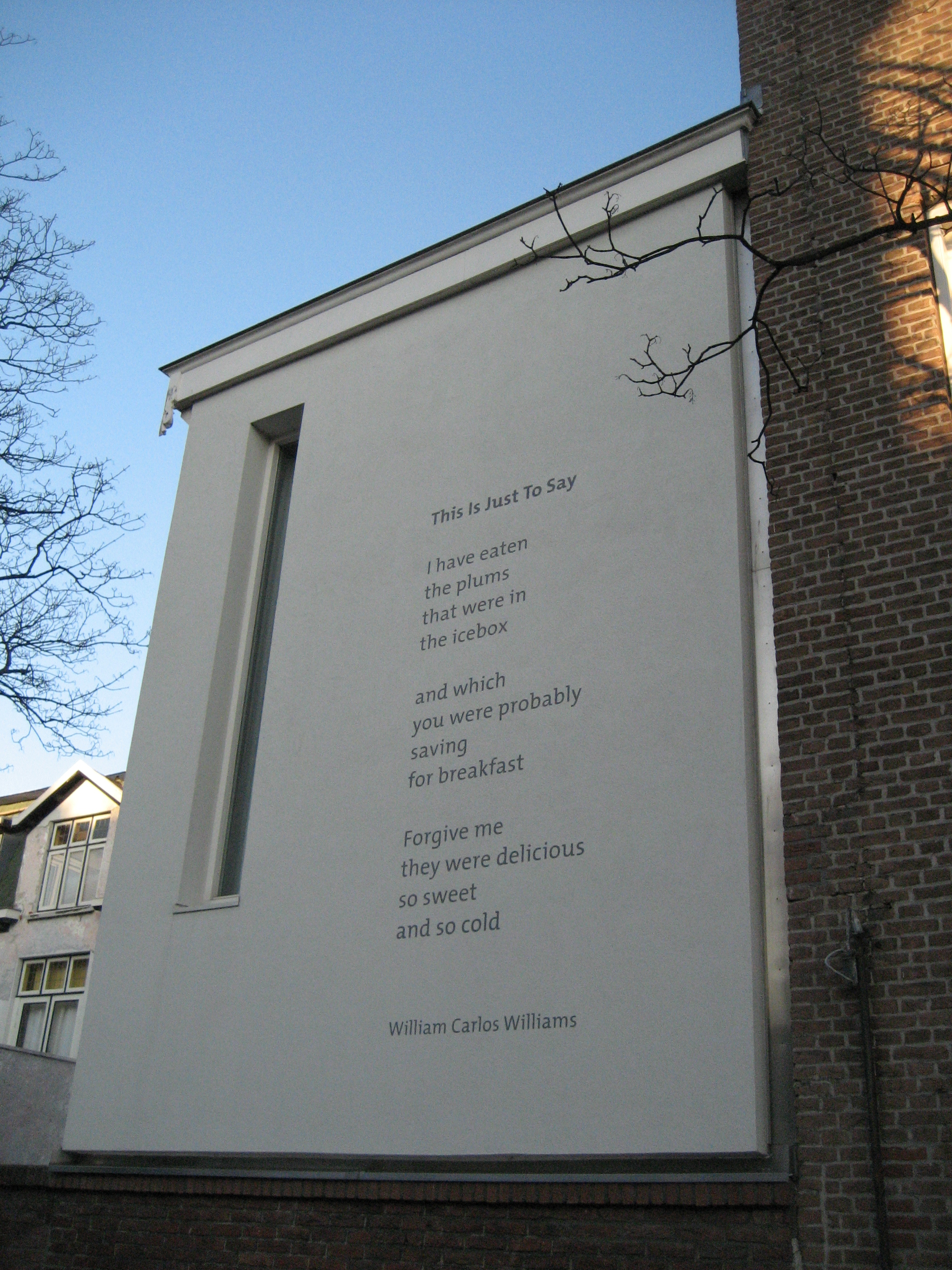
This Is Just to Say (Wall poem in The Hague)

"This Is Just to Say" (1934) is an imagist poem by William Carlos Williams. The three-versed, 28-word poem is an apology about eating the reader's plums. The poem was written as if it were a note left on a kitchen table. It has been widely pastiched.

== Analysis ==
The poem appears to the reader like a piece of found poetry. Metrically, the poem exhibits no regularity of stress or of syllable count. Except for lines two and five (each an iamb) and lines eight and nine (each an amphibrach), no two lines have the same metrical form. The consonance of the letters "Th" in lines two, three, and four, as well the consonance of the letter "F" in lines eight and nine, and the letter "S" in lines eleven and twelve give rise to a natural rhythm when the poem is read aloud.

A conspicuous lack of punctuation contributes to the poem's tonal ambiguity. While the second stanza begins with a conjunction, implying a connection to the first stanza, the third stanza is separated from the first two by the capitalised "Forgive". In a 1950 interview, John W. Gerber asked the poet what it is that makes "This Is Just to Say" a poem; Williams replied, "In the first place, it's metrically absolutely regular ... So, dogmatically speaking, it has to be a poem because it goes that way, don't you see!" Critic Marjorie Perloff writes, "on the page, the three little quatrains look alike; they have roughly the same physical shape. It is typography rather than any kind of phonemic recurrence that provides directions for the speaking voice (or for the eye that reads the lines silently) and that teases out the poem's meanings." Additionally, this typographical structure influences any subsequent interpretation on the part of the reader.

The "reply" of Williams' wife Florence to This Is Just to Say is included as a "Detail" in the partially published Detail & Parody for the poem Paterson (a manuscript at SUNY Buffalo) first appearing in 1982. Since Williams chose to include the "reply" in his own sequence it seems likely that he took a note left by his wife and turned it into a poem.
