= The Red Wheelbarrow =

Poem by William Carlos Williams

"The Red Wheelbarrow" is a poem by American modernist poet William Carlos Williams. Originally published without a title, it was designated "XXII" in Williams' 1923 book Spring and All, a hybrid collection which incorporated alternating selections of free verse and prose. Only 16 words long, "The Red Wheelbarrow" is one of Williams' most frequently anthologized poems, and a prime example of early twentieth-century Imagism.

== Writing and publication ==
XXII
from Spring and All (1923)

so much depends
upon

a red wheel
barrow

glazed with rain
water

beside the white
chickens.

The pictorial style in which the poem is written owes much to the photographs of Alfred Stieglitz and the precisionist style of Charles Sheeler, an American photographer-painter whom Williams met shortly before composing the poem. The poem represents an early stage in Williams' development as a poet. It focuses on the objective representation of objects, in line with the Imagist philosophy that was ten years old at the time of the poem's publication. The poem is written in a brief, haiku-like free-verse form. With regard to the inspiration for the poem, Williams wrote in 1954:

["The Red Wheelbarrow"] sprang from affection for an old Negro named Marshall. He had been a fisherman, caught porgies off Gloucester. He used to tell me how he had to work in the cold in freezing weather, standing ankle deep in cracked ice packing down the fish. He said he didn't feel cold. He never felt cold in his life until just recently. I liked that man, and his son Milton almost as much. In his back yard I saw the red wheelbarrow surrounded by the white chickens. I suppose my affection for the old man somehow got into the writing.

In 2015, research identified the man who had inspired the work as Thaddeus Lloyd Marshall Sr., who lived a few blocks away from Williams in Rutherford, New Jersey, and is buried in Ridgelawn Cemetery in neighboring Clifton.

When the poem was originally published in Spring and All, it was simply titled "XXII", denoting the poem's order within the book. Referring to the poem as "The Red Wheelbarrow" has been frowned upon by some critics, including Neil Easterbrook, who said that such reference gives the text "a specifically different frame" than that which Williams originally intended.

Prior to the revelation about Marshall, some critics and literary analysts believed that the poem was written about one of Williams' patients, a little girl who was seriously ill:

This poem is reported to have been inspired by a scene in Passaic, New Jersey, where Williams was attending to a sick young girl. Worried that his patient may not survive, Williams looked out the window and saw the wheelbarrow and chickens.

At the time, I remember being mystified by the poem. However, being properly trained in literary criticism, I wondered what the real meaning of the poem was, what it was really about. ... What is left out of Williams' poem is the fact that when he conceived that image he was sitting at the bedside of a very sick child (Williams was a medical doctor). The story goes that as he sat there, deeply concerned about the child, he looked out the window, saw that image, and penned those words.

I remember well the sneer associated with sentimentality in the university English classes of the early 70s. William Carlos Williams' celebrated red wheelbarrow poem was written after a night at the bedside of a desperately sick child, but to directly mention the child and describe that situation would have been to court pathos. Such a poem would have been fit only for greeting cards or the poor souls who didn't know any better than to like Robert Service.

Of course you can't figure it out by studying the text. The clues aren't there. This poem was meant to be appreciated only by a chosen literary elite, only by those who were educated, those who had learned the back story (Williams was a doctor, and he wrote the poem one morning after having treated a child who was near death. The red wheelbarrow was her toy.)

Orrick Johns' "Blue Under-Shirts Upon a Line"—first published in Others in 1915—may have provided the framework upon which Williams developed "The Red Wheelbarrow". In his 2010 essay in College Literature, Mark Hama "proposes that what Williams likely recognized in his friend Johns’s poem was the framework for a new modern American poetic line."

== Critical reception ==
The poet John Hollander cited "The Red Wheelbarrow" as a good example of enjambment to slow down the reader, creating a "meditative" poem.

The editors of Exploring Poetry believe that the meaning of the poem and its form are intimately bound together. They state that "since the poem is composed of one sentence broken up at various intervals, it is truthful to say that 'so much depends upon' each line of the poem. This is so because the form of the poem is also its meaning." This viewpoint is also argued by Henry M. Sayre who compared the poem to the readymade artwork of Marcel Duchamp.

Peter Baker analyzed the poem in terms of theme, writing that "Williams is saying that perception is necessary to life and that the poem itself can lead to a fuller understanding of one's experience."

Kenneth Lincoln saw humor in the poem, writing "perhaps it adds up to no more than a small comic lesson in the necessity of things in themselves."
