= Harvey Shapiro (poet) =

American poet and newspaper editor (1924–2013)

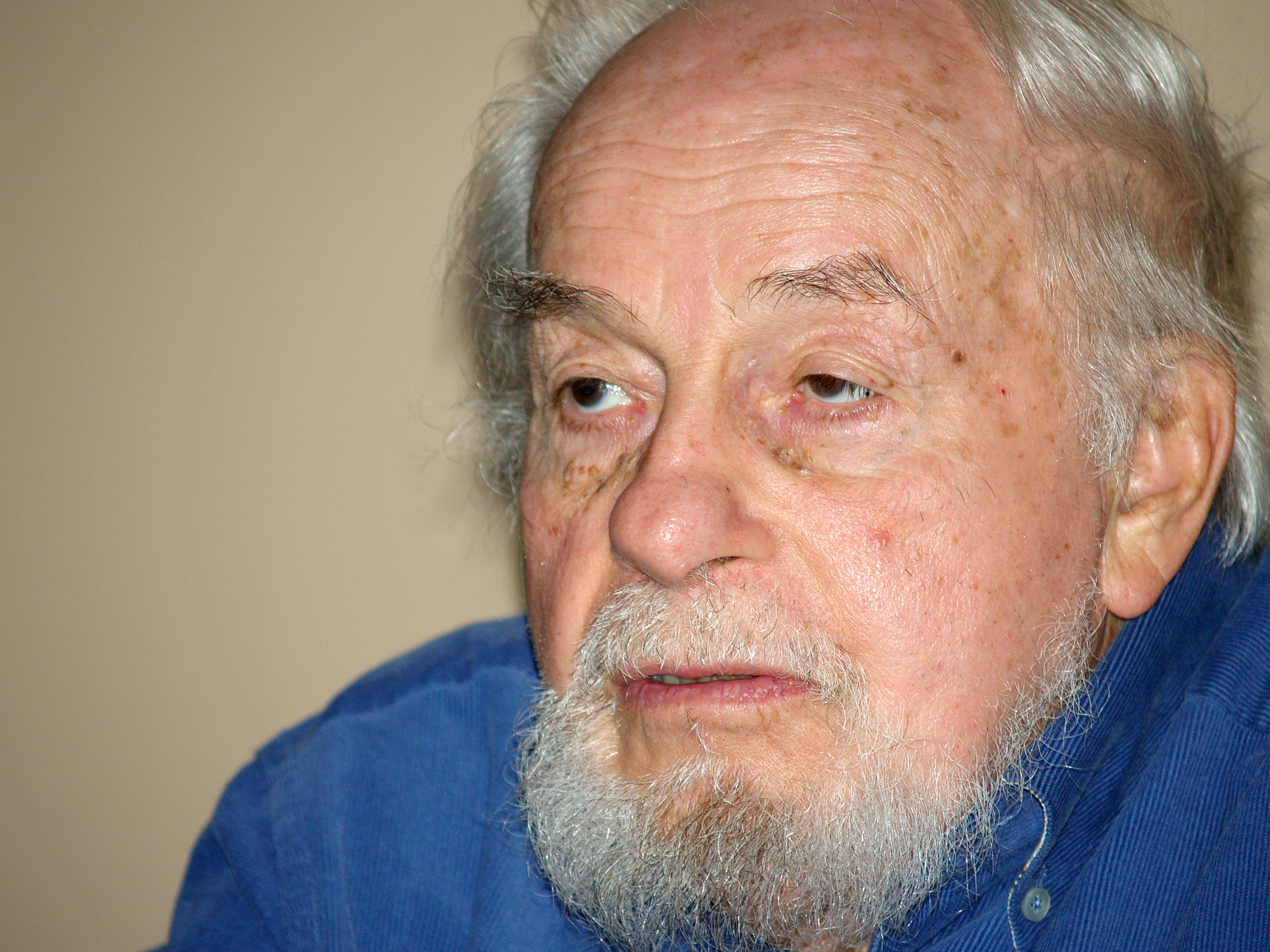
- Born: Harvey Irwin Shapiro; January 27, 1924; Chicago, Illinois, United States
- Died: January 7, 2013 (aged 88); Brooklyn Heights, Brooklyn, New York, US
- Education: Bachelor's degree in English; Master's degree in American literature
- Alma mater: Yale University; Columbia University
- Occupations: Poet; Former editor of The New York Times
- Years active: 1953–2006 (poet); 1957–2005 (editor)
- Spouse: Edna Lewis Kaufman (divorced)

Harvey Shapiro (January 27, 1924 – January 7, 2013) was an American poet and editor of The New York Times. He wrote a dozen books of poetry from 1953 to 2006, writing in epigrammatic style about things in his everyday life. As an editor, he was always affiliated with The New York Times in some capacity, mainly in the magazine and book reviews, from 1957 to 2005.

== Early life and the war ==
Harvey Irwin Shapiro was born in Chicago on January 27, 1924, into a Jewish family from Kiev. He spoke Yiddish. When he was a boy, his family moved to Manhattan and later to Long Island. He studied at Yale University but joined the Army Air Forces when World War II broke out. He flew 35 combat missions over Europe as a B-17 tail gunner and was awarded the Distinguished Flying Cross. He returned to Yale to earn a bachelor's degree in English in 1947, and in 1948 earned a master's degree in American literature from Columbia University in 1948.

== Newspaper career ==
Shapiro spent the first half of the 1950s teaching English at Cornell University and Bard College. He then became an assistant editor at Commentary magazine and was the poetry editor at The Village Voice and a fiction editor at The New Yorker before joining The New York Times in 1957. He worked in various editorial positions there—The New York Times Magazine, The New York Times Book Review from 1975 to 1983 he was the Editor of The Book Review and prior to that he was deputy editor of the Magazine. Perhaps the most notable public legacy at The New York Times was in 1962 when he had read that civil rights leader Dr. Martin Luther King Jr. had been jailed. He phoned Dr. King's foundation, the Southern Christian Leadership Conference, and suggested that, the next time King was jailed he should compose a letter to publish in the manner of Gandhi. This letter became the "Letter from Birmingham Jail", after Dr. King was arrested for the Birmingham campaign in April 1963. Shapiro's superiors would not allow him to print Dr. King's letter in The New York Times, but the letter was printed elsewhere 50 times in 325 editions, including Dr. King's own book Why We Can't Wait (1964).

== Poet ==
Shapiro continued to write poetry while working as an editor, publishing a dozen books, including The Eye (1953), The Light Holds (1984) and National Cold Storage Company (1988). He also edited an anthology entitled Poets of World War II, published in 2003 by the Library of America. His poetry often displayed a subtle sense of humor.

== Personal life ==
Shapiro was married to and later divorced from Edna Lewis Kaufman. He resided in Brooklyn Heights, Brooklyn, until his death on January 7, 2013, after complications from surgery. He was 88 years old.
