= The Knife of the Times and Other Stories =

Collection of short fiction by William Carlos Williams

- First edition cover
- Language: English
- Genre: Short story collection
- Publisher: Dragon Press
- Publication date: 1932
- Publication place: United States
- Media type: Print (hardcover)
- Pages: 164
- ISBN: 978-0841494022

The Knife of the Times and Other Stories is a collection of 11 works of short fiction by William Carlos Williams published by Dragon Press in 1932. The stories also appear in The Farmers' Daughters: The Collected Short Stories of William Carlos Williams (1961).

These short literary works mark a shift in Williams' development as a writer and the expression of his social concerns, influenced by the impact of the Great Depression on American workers and their families.

== Stories ==
- "The Knife of the Times"
- "A Visit to the Fair"
- "Hands Across the Sea"
- "The Sailor's Son"
- "An Old Time Raid"
- "The Buffalos"
- "Mind and Body"
- "The Colored Girls of Passenack—Old and New"
- "A Descendant of Kings"
- "Pink and Blue"
- "Old Doc Rivers"

== Critical assessment ==
"The 'knife' and the 'times' in the title may well be seen as metaphors...In certain instances the 'knife' is a cutting tongue of verbal insults and abuses; in other instances it is the looming threat of insanity and nervous breakdown, of losing control of one's life, one's job, one's mental as well as physical health. In some instances it is the 'knife' of drug addiction and alcoholism; of homosexual rather than heterosexual yearnings; of racism and rape and violence in real and imagined forms..."

— Literary critic Robert F. Gish in William Carlos Williams: A Study of the Short Fiction (1989).

The title of the collection, in particular the metaphor of the "knife,' is derived from the historic hardships suffered by working Americans during the Great Depression: "On the choice of title...Williams observed, 'The times—that was the knife that was killing [the poor].'"

Literary critic Robert F. Gish comments on the "proletarian spirit" that informs the subjects and themes in The Knife of the Times:

Willams felt empathy [for] working-class people, the poor and the disadvantaged, which he characterizes so well in his short stories, depends very much indeed on the power of words [and] the rare and special presence of ordinary speech, ordinary American language, and the "native voice" as he heard it spoken by immigrants and first-generation Americans of various ethnic, cultural, and racial backgrounds. In that sense, the proletarian presence in his stories...became his own special proficiency as a writer.

Williams remarked: "I got to love these people. They were all right."

Literary critic James E. B. Breslin notes that the social and political upheavals of that period "clearly turned Williams' sympathetic attention to the lower class inhabitants" and to the short story form as the best way to convey their struggles.

Biographer Thomas R. Whitaker comments on the impact of William's medical practice during the economic crisis the 1930s on his literary subjects:

Though Williams had written short stories during the previous decade or so, not until the 1930's did this form become of major importance to him. In the people among whom he worked [as a physician], the Depression was now revealing qualities that demanded a brief narrative form...The stories collected in The Knife of the Times employ an oral style that relies heavily upon rapid and generalized narration and upon strategic focus on a few banal but authentic details.

Biographer Nasrullah Mambrol discerns the "frequently ambiguous role of healing the sick within an infected society." that Williams experienced in his career as a physician treating often poverty-stricken immigrant patients.

Gish describes the blend of autobiography and fiction that characterizes Williams' short fiction in The Knife of the Times: "In terms of personae, point-of-view, and tone, William's stories are, like his other prose fiction, highly autobiographical. A doctor very much like Williams, with a wife like Flossie, with two sons like the Williams's, with friends like Williams, with a philosophy like Williams's is quite often the principal narrator. Despite these similarities, the stories are ultimately fiction and not autobiography."

== Sources ==
- Breslin, James E. B. 1985. "The Fiction of a Doctor" from William Carlos Williams: An American Artist in William Carlos Williams: A Study of the Short Fiction by Robert F. Gish, Twayne Publishers, Boston, Massachusetts. G. K. Hall & Co. Gordon Weaver, General Editor. pp. 175–178 ISBN 0-8057-8307-5
- Gish, Robert F. (1989). William Carlos Williams: A Study of the Short Fiction. Boston, Massachusetts: Twayne Publishers, G. K. Hall & Co.
- Mambrol, Nasrullah (June 26, 2020). "Analysis of William Carlos Williams's Stories". Literariness (Kannur University).
- Whitaker, Thomas R. 1968. "On the Ground" in William Carlos Williams, Twayne Publishers. Boston, Massachusetts. pp. 97–118. ISBN 9780805708165
