= The Autobiography of William Carlos Williams =

Book by William Carlos Williams

- Book cover for William Carlos Williams's The Autobiography of William Carlos Williams.
- Author: William Carlos Williams
- Language: English
- Genre: Autobiography
- Publisher: W. W. Norton & Company
- Publication date: 1951
- Publication place: United States
- Pages: 402

The Autobiography of William Carlos Williams (also known as The Autobiography, or simply, Autobiography) is an autobiographical book written by William Carlos Williams, and published by W. W. Norton & Company in 1951.
