= Blast (U.S. magazine) =

Blast: Proletarian Short Stories was a short-lived literary magazine that ran for five issues, published in The Bronx from September 1933 to November 1934.

The magazine was edited by Fred and Betty Miller, intended to serve as an alternative to New Masses which had, up to that point, dominated the leftist literary space in the United States. It has been credited as a forerunner "to a wave of independent radical journals that sprang up in surprising numbers in the United States in the following years".

Each of the five issues of Blast included an original work by William Carlos Williams, who was a friend of the Millers. Fred Miller was described by Williams as then being "out of employment: a tool designer living precariously over a garage in Brooklyn.

Williams contributed five stories to Blast. Other contributors included Benjamin Appel, Ilya Ehrenburg and Len Zinberg.
