= William Carlos Williams =

American poet (1883–1963)

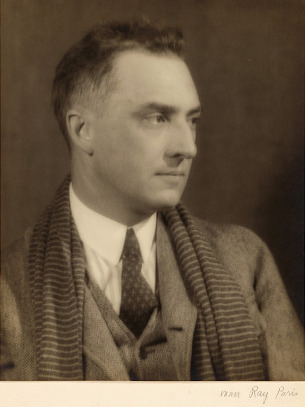
- Portrait by Man Ray, 1924
- Born: September 17, 1883; Rutherford, New Jersey, U.S.
- Died: March 4, 1963 (aged 79); Rutherford, New Jersey, U.S.
- Education: University of Pennsylvania (MD)
- Occupations: Poet; physician
- Spouse: Florence Herman (m. 1912)
- Writing career
- Notable works: Spring and All (1923); Paterson (1946–1958); Pictures from Brueghel and Other Poems (1962)
- Movements: Modernism; Imagism

William Carlos Williams (September 17, 1883 – March 4, 1963) was an American poet and physician closely associated with modernism and imagism. His Spring and All (1923) was written in the wake of T. S. Eliot's The Waste Land (1922). In his five-volume poem Paterson (1946–1958), he took Paterson, New Jersey as "my 'case' to work up: “It called for a poetry such as I did not know, it was my duty to discover or make such a context on the 'thought.'" Some of his best-known poems, "This Is Just to Say" and "The Red Wheelbarrow", are reflections on the everyday. Other poems reflect the influence of the visual arts. He, in turn, influenced the visual arts; his poem "The Great Figure" inspired the painting I Saw the Figure 5 in Gold by Charles Demuth. Williams was awarded a posthumous Pulitzer Prize for Poetry for Pictures from Brueghel and Other Poems (1962).

Williams practiced both pediatrics and general medicine. He was affiliated with Passaic General Hospital, where he served as the hospital's chief of pediatrics from 1924 until his death. The hospital, which is now known as St. Mary's General Hospital, paid tribute to Williams with a memorial plaque that states "We walk the wards that Williams walked".

Randall Jarrell wrote that Williams "feels, not just says, that the differences between men are less important than their similarities—that he and you and I, together, are the Little Men." Marc Hofstadter wrote that Williams "sought to express his democracy through his way of speaking. His point was to speak on an equal level with the reader and to use the language and thought materials of America in expressing his point of view." Per Hugh Fox, Williams saw "the real [original emphasis] function of the imagination as breaking through the alienation of the near at hand and reviving its wonder."

== Early life, family and education ==
Williams was born in Rutherford, New Jersey, in 1883. His father William George Williams was born in England but raised from "a very young age" in the Dominican Republic and "was most comfortable speaking in Spanish, which was the primary language spoken in the Williams's New Jersey household". William Carlos's mother Raquel Hélène Hoheb was from Mayagüez, Puerto Rico, and was of French extraction. Williams's maternal grandmother was named Emily Dickinson, though she was no relation to the poet of that name.

Scholars note that the Caribbean culture of the family home had an important influence on Williams. Jeffrey Herlihy-Mera observes, "English was not his primary means of communication until he was a teenager. At home his mother and father—who were raised in Puerto Rico and the Dominican Republic, respectively—spoke Spanish with each other and to young William Carlos." While he wrote in English, "the poet's first language" was Spanish and his "consciousness and social orientation" were shaped by Caribbean customs; his life influenced "to a very important degree by a plural cultural foundation."

John Keats and Walt Whitman were important early influences on Williams. Williams received his primary and secondary education in Rutherford until 1897 when he was sent for two years to a school near Geneva and to the Lycée Condorcet in Paris. He attended the Horace Mann School upon his return to New York City.

Having passed a special examination, he was admitted in 1902 to the medical school of the University of Pennsylvania, from which he graduated in 1906. Upon leaving Penn, Williams had internships at both French Hospital and Child's Hospital in New York, then went to Leipzig for advanced study of pediatrics.

== Career ==
He published his first book, Poems, in 1909. Shortly after moving to his Ridge Road residence, his second book of poems, The Tempers, was published by a London press through the help of his friend Ezra Pound, whom he had met while studying at the University of Pennsylvania.

Although his primary occupation was as a family doctor, Williams had a successful literary career as a poet. His work has a great affinity with painting, in which he had a lifelong interest. In addition to poetry (his main literary focus), he occasionally wrote short stories, plays, novels, essays, and translations. He practiced medicine by day and wrote at night. Early in his career, he briefly became involved in the Imagist movement through his friendships with Pound and H.D. (whom he had befriended during his medical studies at Penn), but soon he began to develop opinions that differed from theirs and his style changed to express his commitment to a modernist expression of his immediate environment. He was influenced by the "inarticulate poems" of his patients.

In 1920, Williams was sharply criticized by many of his peers (including H.D., Pound and Wallace Stevens) when he published one of his more experimental books Kora in Hell: Improvisations. Pound called the work "incoherent" and H.D. thought the book was "flippant". The Dada artist and poet Baroness Elsa criticized Williams's sexual and artistic politics in her experimental prose poem review titled "Thee I call 'Hamlet of Wedding Ring'", published in The Little Review in March 1921. Williams had an affair with the Baroness, and published three poems in Contact, describing the forty-year-old as "an old lady" with "broken teeth [and] syphilis".

In 1923, Williams published Spring and All, one of his seminal books of poetry, which contained the classics "By the road to the contagious hospital", "The Red Wheelbarrow" and "To Elsie". However, in 1922, the publication of T. S. Eliot's The Waste Land had become a literary sensation that overshadowed Williams's very different brand of poetic modernism. In his Autobiography, Williams later wrote of "the great catastrophe to our letters—the appearance of T. S. Eliot's The Waste Land." He said,

I felt at once that The Waste Land had set me back twenty years and I'm sure it did. Critically, Eliot returned us to the classroom just at the moment when I felt we were on a point to escape to matters much closer to the essence of a new art form itself—rooted in the locality which should give it fruit.

Although he respected the work of Eliot, Williams became openly critical of Eliot's highly intellectual style with its frequent use of foreign languages and allusions to classical and European literature. Instead, Williams preferred colloquial American English.

During the 1930s, Williams began working on an opera, The First President, about George Washington and his influence on the history of the United States of America and was intended to "galvanize us into a realization of what we are today." As a lifelong radical democrat, Williams often collaborated with left-wing and anti-fascist circles and magazines, particularly during the Great Depression.

—Say it, no ideas but in things—
nothing but the blank faces of the houses
and cylindrical trees
bent, forked by preconception and accident—
split, furrowed, creased, mottled, stained—
secret—into the body of the light!

— from Paterson: Book I

In Paterson (published between 1946 and 1958), an account of the history, people, and essence of Paterson, New Jersey, Williams wrote his own modern epic poem, focusing on "the local" on a wider scale than he had previously attempted. He also examined the role of the poet in American society and famously summarized his poetic method in the phrase "No ideas but in things" (found in his poem "A Sort of a Song" and repeated again and again in Paterson).

In his later years, Williams mentored and influenced many younger poets. He had a significant influence on many of the American literary movements of the 1950s, including the Beat movement, the San Francisco Renaissance, the Black Mountain school, and the New York School.

One of Williams's more dynamic relationships as a mentor was with fellow New Jersey poet Allen Ginsberg. Williams included several of Ginsberg's letters in Paterson, stating that one of them helped inspire the fifth section of that work. Williams also wrote the introduction to Ginsberg's first book, Howl and Other Poems in 1956.

== Personal life ==
Williams married Florence ("Flossie") Herman (1891–1976) in 1912 after he returned from Germany. They moved into a house on 9 Ridge Road in Rutherford, New Jersey, where they resided for many years.

Around 1914, Williams and his wife had their first son, William E. Williams, followed by their second son, Paul H. Williams, in 1917. William E. also became a physician.

Williams suffered a heart attack in 1948, and after 1949, a series of strokes. Severe depression after one such stroke caused him to be confined to Hillside Hospital, New York, for four months in 1953. He died on March 4, 1963, at age 79 at his home in Rutherford. He was buried in Hillside Cemetery in Lyndhurst, New Jersey.

== Poetry ==
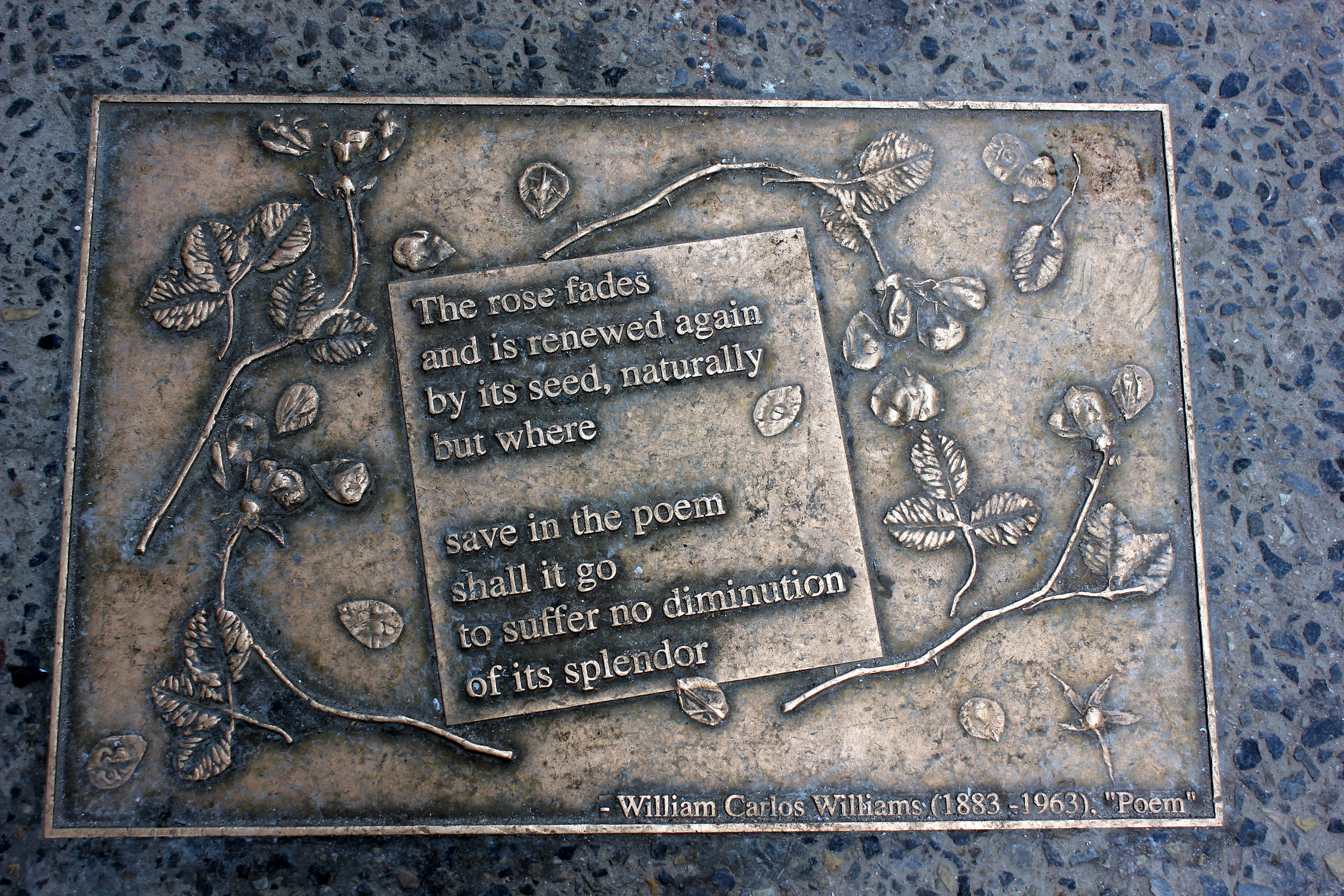
A selection of William Carlos Williams poetry on a plaque in New York City

The poet and critic Randall Jarrell stated of Williams's poetry,

William Carlos Williams is as magically observant and mimetic as a good novelist. He reproduces the details of what he sees with surprising freshness, clarity, and economy; and he sees just as extraordinarily, sometimes, the forms of this earth, the spirit moving behind the letters. His quick transparent lines have the nervous and contracted strength, move as jerkily and intently as a bird.

R. P. Blackmur said of Williams's poetry, "the Imagism of 1912, self-transcended." A contemporary, Harriet Monroe, stated "to assert his freedoms he must play the devil, showing himself rioting in purple and turquoise pools of excess."

Williams's major collections are Spring and All (1923), The Desert Music and Other Poems (1954), Pictures from Brueghel and Other Poems (1962), and Paterson (1963, repr. 1992). His most anthologized poem is "The Red Wheelbarrow", an example of the Imagist movement's style and principles (see also "This Is Just to Say"). However, Williams, like his peer and friend Ezra Pound, had rejected the Imagist movement by the time this poem was published as part of Spring and All in 1923.

Williams is strongly associated with the American modernist movement in literature and saw his poetic project as a distinctly American one; he sought to renew language through the fresh, raw idiom that grew out of United States cultural and social heterogeneity, at the same time freeing it from what he saw as the worn-out language of British and European culture. “No one believes that poetry can exist in his own life,” Williams said. “The purpose of an artist, whatever it is, is to take the life, whatever he sees, and to raise it up to an elevated position where it has dignity.”

In 1920, Williams turned his attentions to Contact, a periodical launched by Williams and fellow writer Robert McAlmon: "The two editors sought American cultural renewal in the local condition in clear opposition to the internationalists—Pound, The Little Review, and the Baroness." Yvor Winters, the poet/critic, judged that Williams's verse bears a certain resemblance to the best lyric poets of the 13th century.

Williams sought to invent an entirely fresh and uniquely American form of poetry whose subject matter centered on everyday circumstances of life and the lives of common people. He came up with the concept of the "variable foot" which Williams never clearly defined, although the concept vaguely referred to Williams's method of determining line breaks. The Paris Review called it "a metrical device to resolve the conflict between form and freedom in verse."

One of Williams's aims, in experimenting with his "variable foot", was to show the American (opposed to European) rhythm that he claimed was present in everyday American language. Stylistically, Williams also worked with variations on a line-break pattern that he labeled "triadic-line poetry" in which he broke a long line into three free-verse segments. A well-known example of the "triadic line [break]" can be found in Williams's love-poem "Asphodel, That Greeny Flower."

In a review of Herbert Leibowitz's biography of Williams, book critic Christopher Benfey wrote:

Early and late, Williams held the conviction that poetry was, in his friend Kenneth Burke's phrase, "equipment for living, a necessary guide amid the bewilderments of life." The American ground was wild and new, a place where a blooming foreigner needed all the help he could get. Poems were as essential to a full life as physical health or the love of men and women.

== Williams and the painters ==
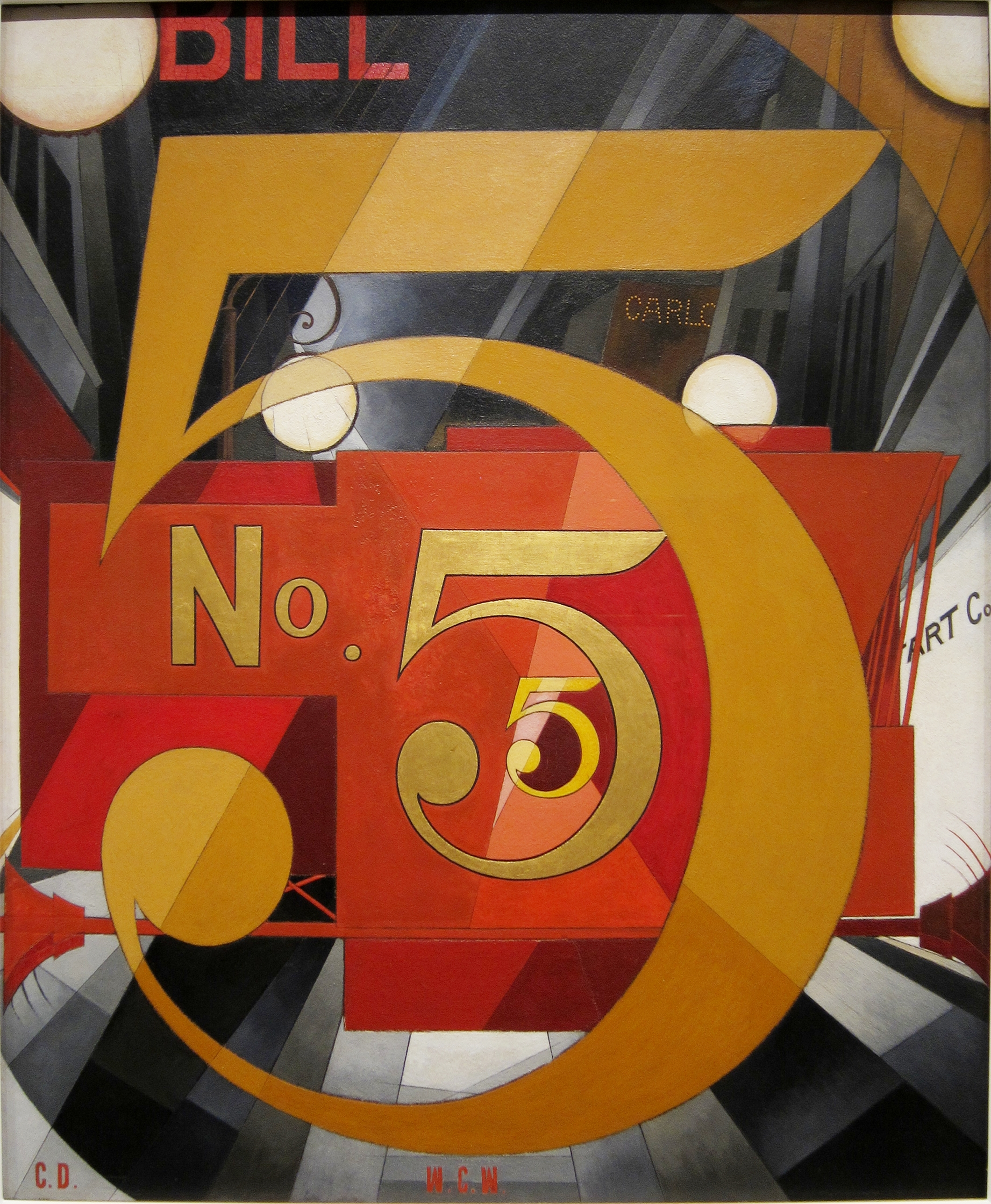
I saw the figure 5 in gold. Charles Demuth, 1928. The Great Figure Among the rain and lights I saw the figure 5 in gold on a red firetruck moving tense unheeded to gong clangs siren howls and wheels rumbling through the dark city. William Carlos Williams 1920.

Williams's mother had trained as a painter in Paris and passed on her enthusiasm to her son, who also painted in his early years. A painting by him now hangs in Yale University's Beinecke Library and as late as 1962 he was still remembering in an interview that "I'd like to have been a painter, and it would have given me at least as great a satisfaction as being a poet." For most of his life Williams wrote art criticism and introductions to exhibitions by his friends.

In 1915, Williams began to associate with the New York group of artists and writers known as "The Others." Founded by the poet Alfred Kreymborg and the artist Man Ray, they included Walter Conrad Arensberg, Wallace Stevens, Mina Loy, Marianne Moore, Orrick Glenday Johns and Marcel Duchamp. Interlocking with them were the US artists who met at Arensburg's studio, including Marsden Hartley, Joseph Stella, Charles Demuth and Charles Sheeler, with whom Williams developed close friendships.

Although he championed the new way of seeing and representation pioneered by the European avant-garde, Williams and his artistic friends wished to get away from what they saw as a purely derivative style. As one result, he started Contact magazine with Hartley in 1920 in order to create an outlet for works showcasing the belief that creative work should derive from the artist's direct experience and sense of place and reject traditional notions of how this should be done.

Precisionism emerged in response to such thinking. In her study of the influence of painting on Williams, Ruth Grogan devoted several paragraphs to the dependency of some of his poems on the paintings of Charles Sheeler in this style, singling out in particular the description of a power house in Williams's "Classic Scene". But the close relationship with Charles Demuth was more overt. Williams's poem "The Pot of Flowers" (1923) references Demuth's painting "Tuberoses" (1922), which he owned. On his side, Demuth created his "I saw the figure 5 in gold" (1928) as a homage to Williams's poem "The Great Figure" (1921). Williams's collection Spring and All (1923) was dedicated to the artist and, after his early death, he dedicated the long poem "The Crimson Cyclamen." (1936) to Demuth's memory.

Later collaborations with artists include the two poem/ two drawing volume that he shared with William Zorach in 1937 and his poem "Jersey Lyric", written in response to Henry Niese's 1960 painting of the same title:

View of winter trees
before
one tree

in the foreground
where
by fresh-fallen

snow
lie 6 woodchunks ready
for the fire

Throughout his career, Williams thought of his approach to poetry as a painterly deployment of words, saying explicitly in an interview, "I've attempted to fuse the poetry and painting, to make it the same thing….A design in the poem and a design in the picture should make them more or less the same thing." However, in the case of his references to much earlier painters, culminating in Pictures from Brueghel (1962), his approach was more commentarial. Of this late phase of his work it has been claimed that "Williams saw these artists solving, in their own ways, the same problems that concerned him," but his engagement with them was at a distance.

== Legacy, awards and honors ==
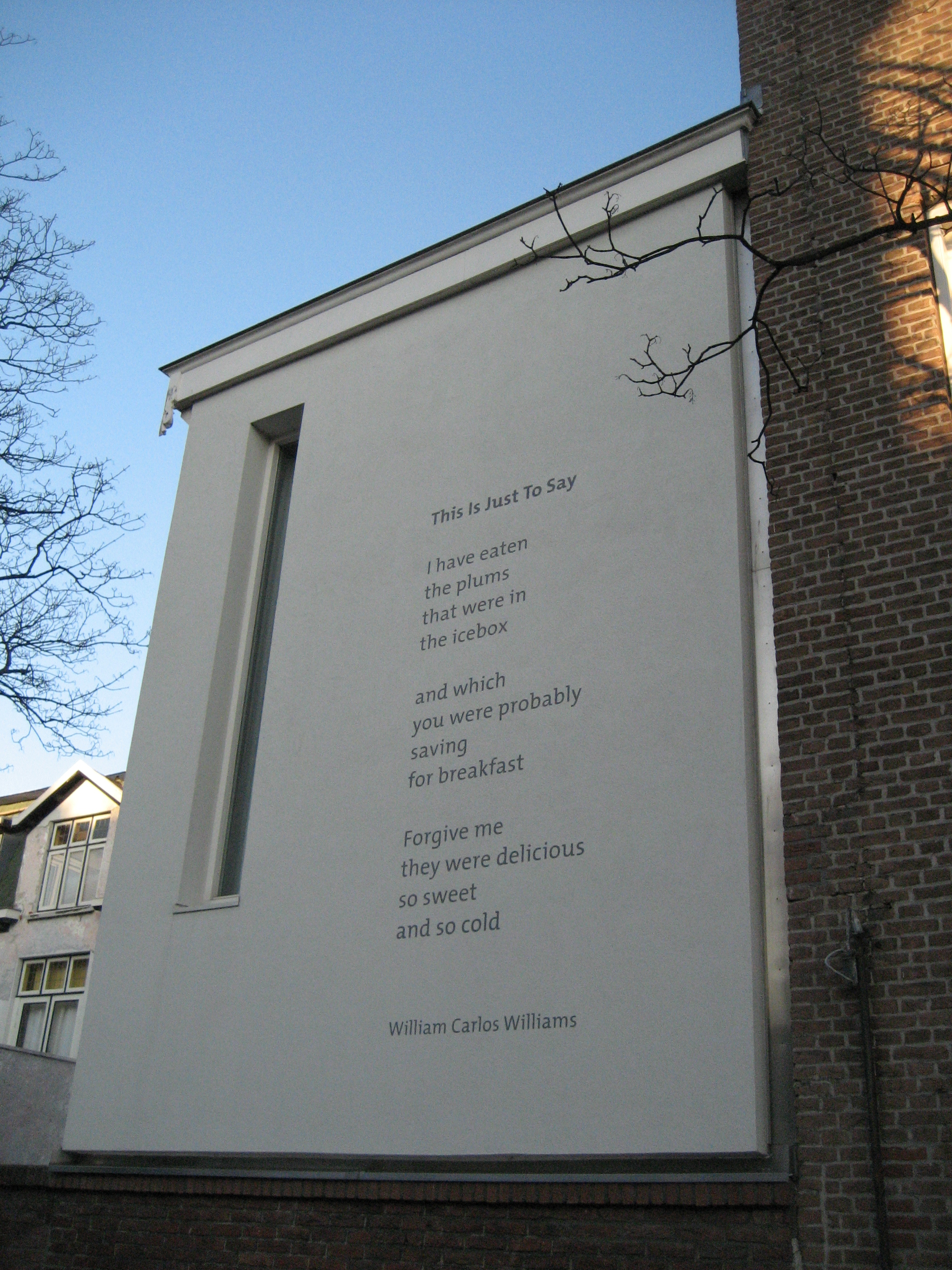
This Is Just to Say (wall poem in The Hague)

The U.S. National Book Award was reestablished in 1950 with awards by the book industry to authors of books published in 1949 in three categories. Williams won the first National Book Award for Poetry, recognizing both the third volume of Paterson and Selected Poems.

In 1952, Williams was named Consultant in Poetry to the Library of Congress in Washington, DC, but was barred from serving out his term due to unfounded accusations of Williams's membership in a communist organization. Williams retained legal counsel to refute the charges but was never allowed to respond to his critics and never received an apology from the Library of Congress. The next year, however, he received the Bollingen Prize along with Archibald MacLeish.

In May 1963, he was posthumously awarded the Pulitzer Prize for Pictures from Brueghel and Other Poems (1962) and the gold medal for Poetry of the National Institute of Arts and Letters. The Poetry Society of America presents the William Carlos Williams Award annually for the best book of poetry published by a small, non-profit or university press.

Williams's house in Rutherford was added to the National Register of Historic Places in 1973. He was inducted into the New Jersey Hall of Fame in 2009.

== Bibliography ==
=== Poetry collections ===
- Poems (1909)
- The Tempers (1913)
- Al Que Quiere! (1917)
- Sour Grapes (1921)
- Spring and All (1923)
- Go Go (1923)
- The Cod Head (1932)
- Collected Poems, 1921–1931 (1934)
- An Early Martyr and Other Poems (1935)
- Adam & Eve & The City (1936)
- The Complete Collected Poems of William Carlos Williams, 1906–1938 (1938)
- The Broken Span (1941)
- The Wedge (1944)
- Paterson Book I (1946); Book II (1948); Book III (1949); Book IV (1951); Book V (1958)
- Clouds, Aigeltinger, Russia (1948)
- The Collected Later Poems (1950; rev. ed.1963)
- Collected Earlier Poems (1951; rev. ed., 1966)
- The Desert Music and Other Poems (1954)
- Journey to Love (1955)
- Pictures from Brueghel and Other Poems (1962)
- Paterson (Books I–V in one volume), (1963)
- The Red Wheelbarrow (1923)

=== Books, prose ===
- Kora in Hell: Improvisations (1920) – Prose-poem improvisations.
- The Great American Novel (1923) – A novel.
- Spring and All (1923) – A hybrid of prose and verse.
- In the American Grain (1925), 1967, repr. New Directions 2004 – Prose on historical figures and events.
- A Voyage to Pagany (1928) – An autobiographical travelogue in the form of a novel.
- Novelette and Other Prose (1932)
- The Knife of the Times and Other Stories (1932)
- White Mule (1937) – A novel.
- Life Along the Passaic River (1938) – Short stories.
- In the Money (1940) – Sequel to White Mule.
- Make Light of It: Collected Stories of William Carlos Williams (1950)
- Autobiography (1951) W. W. Norton & Co. (1 February 1967)
- The Build-Up (1952) – Completes the "Stecher trilogy" begun with White Mule.
- Selected Essays (1954)
- The Selected Letters of William Carlos Williams (1957)
- I Wanted to Write a Poem: The Autobiography of the Works of a Poet (1958)
- Yes, Mrs. Williams: A Personal Record of My Mother (1959)
- The Farmers' Daughters: The Collected Short Stories of William Carlos Williams (1961)
- Imaginations (1970) – A collection of five previously published early works.
- The Embodiment of Knowledge (1974) – Philosophical and critical notes and essays.
- Interviews With William Carlos Williams: "Speaking Straight Ahead" (1976)
- A Recognizable Image: William Carlos Williams on Art and Artists (1978)
- The Doctor Stories: Compiled by Robert Coles (1984)
- Pound/Williams: Selected Letters of Ezra Pound and William Carlos Williams (1996)
- The Collected Stories of William Carlos Williams (1996)
- The Letters of Denise Levertov and William Carlos Williams (1998)
- William Carlos Williams and Charles Tomlinson: A Transatlantic Connection (1998)
- The Humane Particulars: The Collected Letters of William Carlos Williams and Kenneth Burke (2004)

=== Drama ===
- The First President (opera, 1936)
- A Dream of Love (1949)
- Tituba’s Children (1950)
- Many Loves (1959)
- The Cure (1960)

The above are collected in Many Loves and Other Plays: The Collected Plays of William Carlos Williams (1962)

=== Translations ===
- Last Nights of Paris (1929) – A novel translated from the French of Philippe Soupault.
- By Word of Mouth: Poems from the Spanish, 1916–1959 (2011) – Poetry of Spanish and Latin American authors.
- The Dog and the Fever (2018) – A novella translated, in collaboration with Raquel Hélène Williams, from the Spanish of Pedro Espinosa.

== See also ==
- List of Puerto Rican writers
- William Carlos Williams Center for the Performing Arts
- Epic poetry
- Latino poetry
- Puerto Rican poetry
