= Gordon Weaver =

American novelist and short story writer (1937–2021)

Gordon A. Weaver
- Born: February 2, 1937; Moline, Illinois, U.S.
- Died: April 2, 2021 (aged 84); Milwaukee, Wisconsin, U.S.
- Education: University of Wisconsin–Milwaukee University of Illinois (MA), University of Denver (Ph.D)
- Occupation: Author
- Children: 3
- Writing career
- Notable work: Count a Lonely Cadence
- Notable awards: O. Henry Award, 1979

Gordon A. Weaver (February 2, 1937 – April 2, 2021) was an American novelist and short story writer.

== Life and career ==
Weaver was born in Moline, Illinois in February 1937, the fifth of the five children of Noble Rodell Weaver and Inez Katherine Nelson. His family moved to Milwaukee, Wisconsin in 1941. He graduated from Wauwatosa High School in 1955. After three years service in the United States Army (1955–1958), he graduated from the University of Wisconsin–Milwaukee in 1961, from the University of Illinois with an MA in 1962, and from the University of Denver with a Ph.D. in 1970. He taught at Siena College 1963–1965, Marietta College 1965–1968, University of Southern Mississippi 1970–1975, Oklahoma State University 1975–1995, Vermont College 1983–1989, and University of Wisconsin–Milwaukee 1996–2000.

He was founding editor of the Mississippi Review, fiction editor of Cimarron Review from 1975 to 1986, managing editor of the AWP (Association of Writers & Writing Programs) Award Series for Short Fiction from 1977 to 1979, and general editor of the Twayne Studies in Short Fiction (Twayne Publishers, Boston/New York) from 1986 to 1997.

More than a hundred of his stories have appeared in a wide variety of literary magazines, including Agni, Antioch Review, Carolina Quarterly, Confrontation, Georgia Review, Iowa Review, The Literary Review, New Letters, Ploughshares, and Southwest Review. His novel Count a Lonely Cadence, was adapted for the movie Cadence, starring Charlie Sheen.

Weaver was the father of three daughters. He retired to the Milwaukee area in the 1990s and died in April 2021.

His papers are held at Boston University.

== Awards ==
- St. Lawrence Award for Fiction (1973)
- Quarterly West Fiction Prize (1978)
- O. Henry First Prize (1978)
- Pushcart Prize in 1985 and 1997
- The Best American Short Stories 1980 for "Hog's Heart"
- National Endowment of the Arts fellowships in 1974 and 1989
- 1979 O. Henry Award
- Sherwood Anderson Award (1982)
- Quarterly West Novella Prize (1984)
- 2002 James C. McCormick Fellowship in Fiction (Christopher Isherwood Foundation).
- Andrew Lytle Fiction Prize (2007)

== Works ==
=== Novels ===
- Count a Lonely Cadence. H. Regnery Co. 1968.
- Give Him a Stone. Crown Publishers. 1975. ISBN 978-0-517-51897-7.
- Circling Byzantium. Louisiana State University Press. November 1980. ISBN 978-0-8071-0694-5.
- The Eight Corners of the World. Chelsea Green Pub. Co. 1988. ISBN 978-0-930031-16-9.
  - republished in a second edition by Serving House Books, 2015. ISBN 978-0986214608

=== Short stories ===
- The Entombed Man of Thule. Baton Rouge: Louisiana State University Press. 1972. ISBN 0-8071-0245-8.
- Such Waltzing Was Not Easy. University of Illinois Press. 1975. ISBN 978-0-252-00476-6.
- Getting Serious. Books on Demand. 1980. ISBN 978-0-608-00872-1.
- Morality Play. Chariton Review Press. 1985. ISBN 978-0-933428-05-8.
- A World Quite Round. Books on Demand. 1986. ISBN 978-0-7837-7932-4.
- Men Who Would Be Good. TriQuarterly Books/Another Chicago Press. 1991. ISBN 978-0-929968-16-2.
- The Way We Know in Dreams. University of Missouri Press. 1994. ISBN 978-0-8262-0931-3.
- Four Decades: New and Selected Stories. University of Missouri Press. 1997. ISBN 978-0-8262-1113-2.
- Long Odds. University of Missouri Press. 2000. ISBN 978-0-8262-1291-7.
- Last Stands: Stories. University of Missouri Press. 2004. ISBN 978-0-8262-1521-5.

=== Poetry ===
- Small Defeats. Texas Review Press. 1999. ISBN 978-1-881515-18-0.

=== Non-fiction ===
- Amy A. Kass, ed. (2008). "Haskell Hooked on Northern Cheyenne". Giving well, doing good: readings for thoughtful philanthropists. Indiana University Press. ISBN 978-0-253-21955-8.

=== Adaptations ===
- The movie Cadence was based on Weaver's novel Count a Lonely Cadence.
