= The Berlin Stories =

1945 anthology by Christopher Isherwood

- The cover of the first edition
- Author: Christopher Isherwood
- Language: English
- Genre: Novels
- Published: 1945
- Publisher: New Directions
- Publication place: United Kingdom
- Media type: Print (Hardback & Paperback)
- ISBN: 0-8112-1804-X
- OCLC: 2709284

The Berlin Stories is a 1945 omnibus by English-American writer Christopher Isherwood, consisting of his two early novels Mr Norris Changes Trains (1935) and Goodbye to Berlin (1939). Set in Jazz Age Berlin between 1930 and 1933 on the cusp of Adolf Hitler's ascent to power as Chancellor of Germany, Isherwood portrays the city during this chaotic interwar period as a carnival of debauchery and despair inhabited by desperate people who are unaware of the national catastrophe that awaits them.

The first novel, Mr Norris Changes Trains, focuses on the misadventures of a smuggler, communist, and spy named Arthur Norris, a character based on Gerald Hamilton, an unscrupulous businessman known as "the wickedest man in Europe," whom Isherwood met in the Weimar Republic. The second novel, Goodbye to Berlin, recounts the travails of various Berlin denizens whose lives become directly or indirectly affected by the Nazis' rise to power. Isherwood based the character of Sally Bowles on teenage cabaret singer and flapper Jean Ross with whom he briefly shared lodgings in Berlin.

Isherwood's Berlin tales inspired John Van Druten's 1951 play I Am a Camera, which in turn inspired the 1955 film I Am a Camera, as well as the 1966 stage musical and 1972 film version of Cabaret. The best-known character from the stories, Sally Bowles, took center stage in these adaptations, even though the character appears as the lead in only one short story in Goodbye to Berlin.

Although The Berlin Stories secured Isherwood's reputation, the author denounced his writings after the collection's publication. In a 1956 essay, Isherwood lamented that he misunderstood the suffering of the people that he depicted, and he regretted depicting many persons as "monsters". In 2010, Time listed the collection as one of the 100 Best English-language works of the 20th century.

== Historical background ==
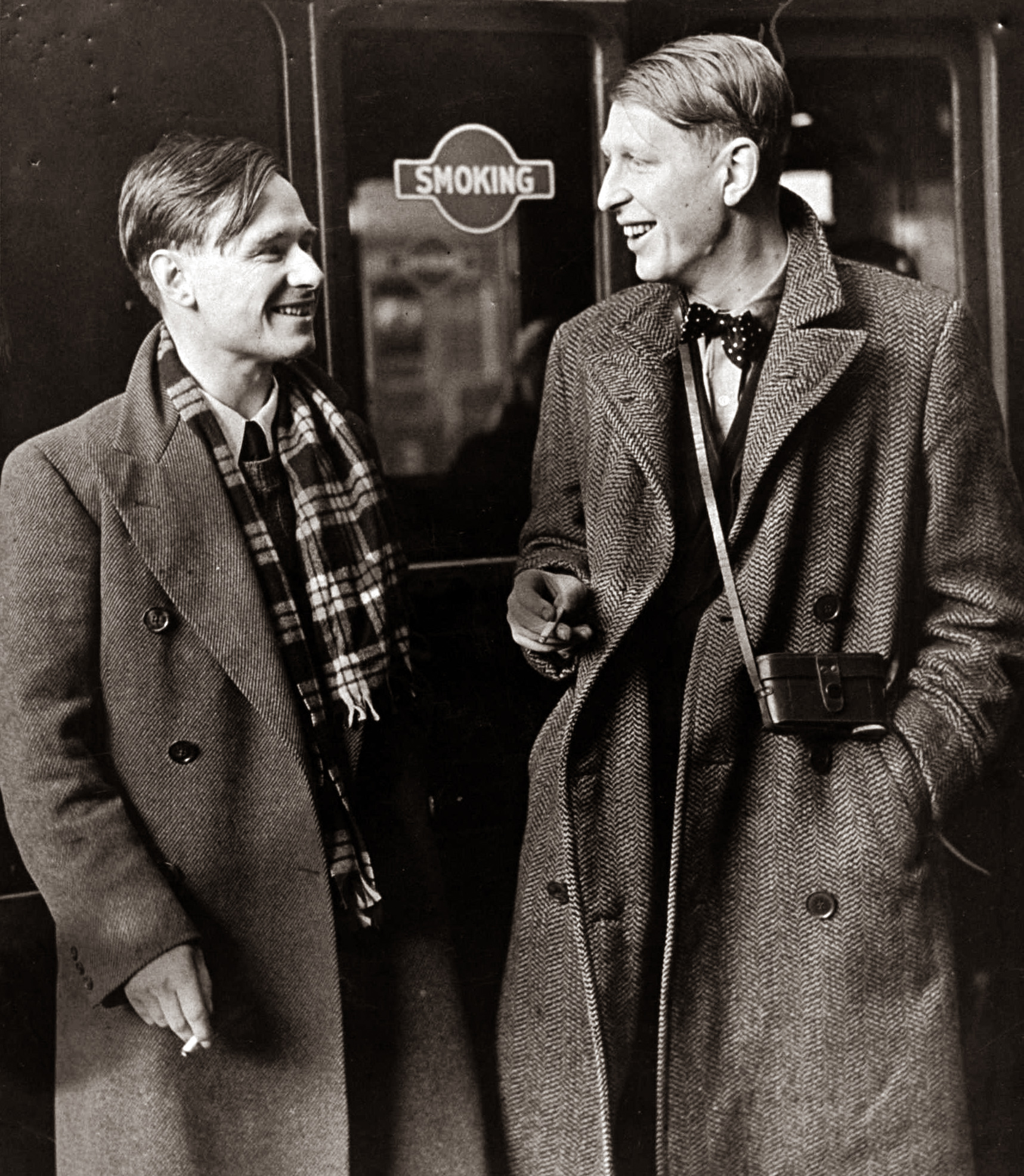
Christopher Isherwood and W. H. Auden circa 1938.

I am a camera with its shutter open, quite passive, recording, not thinking.

— Christopher Isherwood, A Berlin Diary, Autumn 1930

The events depicted in The Berlin Stories are derived from Isherwood's colorful escapades in the Weimar Republic. In 1929, Isherwood moved to Weimar Berlin during the twilight of the Golden Twenties. At the time, Isherwood was an apprentice novelist who was politically indifferent (Note: Jean Ross later claimed the political indifference of the Sally Bowles character more closely resembled Isherwood and his hedonistic friends, many of whom "fluttered around town exclaiming how sexy the storm troopers looked in their uniforms.") about the rise of fascism in Germany. He had relocated to Berlin to pursue a hedonistic life as an openly gay man and to enjoy the city's orgiastic Jazz Age cabarets. He socialized with a blithe coterie of gay writers that included Stephen Spender, Paul Bowles, (Note: Paul Bowles was an American writer who wrote the novel The Sheltering Sky. Isherwood appropriated his surname for the character of Sally Bowles.) and W.H. Auden.

In Berlin during Winter 1930–1931, Isherwood met Gerald Hamilton, an unscrupulous businessman who inspired the fictional character of Arthur Norris. Like the fictional character which he inspired, Hamilton was regarded by his fellow British expatriates to be a "nefarious, amoral, sociopathic, manipulative conniver" who "did not hesitate to use or abuse friends and enemies alike." Isherwood later alleged that Hamilton likely stole a large sum of money from him when the author asked Hamilton to bribe officials in order to rescue his gay lover Heinz Neddermeyer from persecution by the Nazi regime due to his sexual orientation.

Jean [Ross] was more essentially British than Sally [Bowles]; she grumbled like a true Englishwoman, with her 'grin-and-bear-it' grin. And she was tougher. She never struck Christopher as being sentimental or the least bit sorry for herself. Like Sally, she boasted continually about her lovers. In those days, Christopher felt certain that she was exaggerating...

— Christopher Isherwood, Christopher and His Kind (1976)

Due to his limited finances, Isherwood shared modest lodgings in Berlin with 19-year-old flapper Jean Ross, (Note: Isherwood claimed that he and Ross "had a relationship which was asexual but more truly intimate than the relationships between Sally and her various partners in the novel, the plays and the films.") a British cabaret singer who inspired the fictional character of Sally Bowles. An aspiring film actress, Ross earned her living as a chanteuse in lesbian bars and second-rate cabarets. Isherwood visited these nightclubs to hear Ross sing, and he later described her voice as poor yet effective.

"She had a surprisingly deep, husky voice," Isherwood wrote, "She sang badly, (Note: Peter Parker notes that Ross "claimed that Isherwood 'grossly underrated' her singing abilities, but her family agreed that this was one aspect of Sally Bowles that Isherwood got absolutely right".) without any expression, her hands hanging down at her sides—yet her performance was, in its own way, effective because of her startling appearance and her air of not caring a curse of what people thought of her." Likewise, Stephen Spender recalled that Ross' singing ability was quite underwhelming: "In my mind's eye, I can see her now in some dingy bar standing on a platform and singing so inaudibly that I could not hear her from the back of the room where I was discreetly seated."

While rooming together with Isherwood at Nollendorfstrasse 17 in Schöneberg, Ross became pregnant. She assumed the father of the child to be jazz pianist—and later actor—Peter van Eyck. Following Eyck's abandonment of Ross, she underwent an abortion facilitated by Isherwood. Ross nearly died as a result of the botched abortion. This event inspired Isherwood to write his 1937 novella Sally Bowles and is dramatized as its narrative climax. (In later years, Ross regretted her public association with the naïve and apolitical character of Sally Bowles.) While Ross recovered from the abortion procedure, the political situation rapidly deteriorated in Germany.

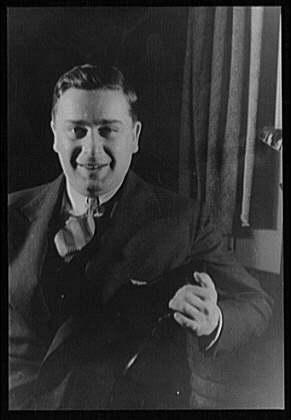
John Van Druten adapted Isherwood's work into the 1951 Broadway play I Am a Camera.

As Berlin's daily scenes featured "poverty, unemployment, political demonstrations and street fighting between the forces of the extreme left and the extreme right," Ross, Spender, and other foreigners realized that they must leave the country. "There was a sensation of doom to be felt in the Berlin streets," Spender recalled. In contrast to Spender's feeling of impending doom, Isherwood complained "somewhat unpresciently to Spender that situation in Germany seemed 'very dull.'"

However, following Adolf Hitler's ascension as Chancellor of Germany on 30 January 1933, Isherwood finally noticed the sinister developments occurring within the country, and he commented to a friend: "Adolf, with his rectangular black moustache, has come to stay and brought all his friends.... Nazis are to be enrolled as 'auxiliary police,' which means that one must now not only be murdered but that it is illegal to offer any resistance." Two weeks after Hitler passed the Enabling Act which cemented his power, Isherwood fled Germany and returned to England on 5 April 1933.

Following Isherwood's departure from Germany and the enstatement of Hitler's brutalitarian regime, most of Berlin's seedy cabarets were shuttered by the Nazis, (Note: Many Berlin cabarets located along the Kurfürstendamm avenue, an entertainment-vice district, had been marked for future destruction by Joseph Goebbels as early as 1928.) and many of Isherwood's cabaret friends would later flee abroad or perish in concentration camps. These factual events served as the genesis for Isherwood's Berlin tales. His 1939 novel Goodbye to Berlin was later adapted by playwright John Van Druten into the 1951 Broadway play I Am a Camera and, ultimately, the 1966 Cabaret musical.

== Plot summaries ==
=== Mr Norris Changes Trains ===
In another moment, when I had drunk exactly the right amount of champagne, I should have a vision. I took a sip. And now, with extreme clarity, without passion or malice, I saw what Life really is. It had something, I remember, to do with the revolving sunshade. Yes, I murmured to myself, let them dance. They are dancing, I am glad.

— Christopher Isherwood, Mr Norris Changes Trains (1935)

While traveling on a train from the Netherlands to Germany, British expatriate William Bradshaw meets a nervous-looking man named Arthur Norris. As they approach the frontier, Bradshaw strikes up a conversation with Norris, who wears an ill-fitting wig and carries a forged passport. After crossing the frontier, Norris invites Bradshaw to dinner, and the two become friends. In Berlin, they see each other frequently. Over time, several oddities of Norris's personal life are revealed, one of which is that he is a masochist. Another is that he is a communist, which is dangerous in Hitler-era Germany. Other aspects of Norris's personal life remain mysterious. He seems to run a business with an assistant Schmidt. Norris gets into more and more straitened circumstances and has to leave Berlin.

Norris subsequently returns with his fortunes restored and apparently conducting communication with an unknown Frenchwoman called Margot. Schmidt reappears and tries to blackmail Norris. Norris uses Bradshaw as a decoy to get an aristocratic friend, Baron Pregnitz, to take a holiday in Switzerland and meet "Margot" under the guise of a Dutchman. Bradshaw is urgently recalled by Ludwig Bayer one of the leaders of the communist groups, who explains that Norris was spying for the French and both his group and the police know about it. Bradshaw observes they are being followed by the police and persuades Norris to leave Germany. After the Reichstag fire, the Nazis eliminate Bayer and most of Norris's comrades. Bradshaw returns to England where he receives intermittent postcards from Norris, who has fled Berlin, pursued by Schmidt. The novel's last words are drawn from a postcard that Norris sends to Bradshaw from Rio de Janeiro: "What have I done to deserve all this?"

=== Goodbye to Berlin ===
I thought of Natalia: she has escaped — none too soon, perhaps. However often the decision may be delayed, all these people are ultimately doomed. This evening is the dress-rehearsal of a disaster. It is like the last night of an epoch.

— Christopher Isherwood, Goodbye to Berlin (1939)

After relocating to Berlin in order to work on his novel, an English writer explores the decadent nightlife of the city and becomes enmeshed in the colorful lives of a diverse array of Berlin denizens. He acquires lodgings in a boarding house owned by Fräulein Schroeder, a caring landlady. At the boarding house, he interacts with the other tenants, including the frank prostitute Fräulein Kost, who has a Japanese patron, and the divinely decadent Sally Bowles, a young Englishwoman who sings in a seedy cabaret. The narrator and Bowles soon become roommates, and he learns a great deal about her sex life as well as her coterie of "marvelous" lovers.

When Sally becomes pregnant after a brief fling, the narrator facilitates an abortion, and the painful incident draws them closer together. When he visits Sally at the hospital, the hospital staff assume he is Sally's impregnator and despise him for forcing her to have an abortion. Later during the summer, he resides at a beach house near the Baltic Sea with Peter and Otto, a gay couple who are struggling with their sexual identities. Jealous of Otto's endless flirtations with other men, Peter departs for England, and the narrator returns to Berlin to live with Otto's family, the Nowaks. During this time, he meets teenage Natalie Landauer whose Jewish family owns a department store. After the Nazis smash the windows of several Jewish shops, he learns that Natalie's cousin Bernhard is dead, likely murdered by the Nazis. Ultimately, the narrator is forced to leave Germany as the Nazis continue their ascent to power, and he fears that many of his beloved Berlin acquaintances are now dead.

== Isherwood's reevaluation ==
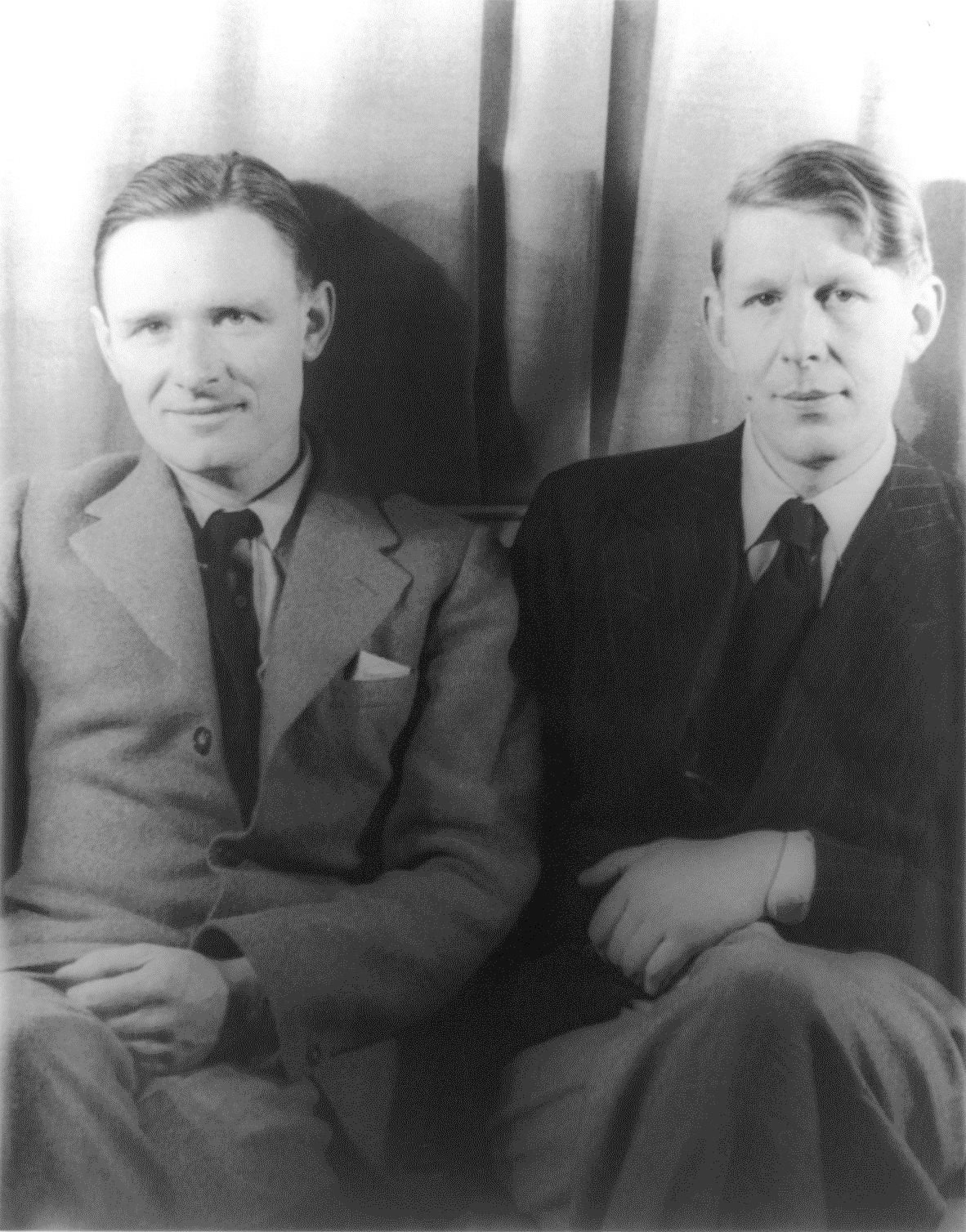
Isherwood in 1939

Although his stories about the nightlife of Weimar Berlin became commercially successful and secured his reputation as an author, Isherwood later denounced his writings. In a 1956 essay, Isherwood lamented that he had not understood the suffering of the people whom he depicted.

Isherwood stated that 1930s Berlin had been "a real city in which human beings were suffering the miseries of political violence and near-starvation. The 'wickedness' of Berlin's night-life was of the most pitiful kind; the kisses and embraces, as always, had price-tags attached to them.... As for the 'monsters', they were quite ordinary human beings prosaically engaged in getting their living through illegal methods. The only genuine monster was the young foreigner who passed gaily through these scenes of desolation, misinterpreting them to suit his childish fantasy."

== See also ==
- List of fiction set in Berlin
