= Jean Ross =

British writer, political activist, and film critic (1911–1973)

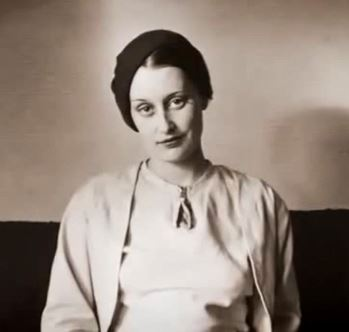
- Ross in c.1931
- Born: Jean Iris Ross; 7 May 1911; Alexandria, Egypt
- Died: 27 April 1973 (aged 61); Richmond, Surrey, England
- Occupations: Journalist, film critic, activist
- Employer(s): Daily Worker (film critic); Daily Express (war correspondent)
- Partner: See list: Eric Maschwitz; Peter van Eyck; John Cornford; Claud Cockburn (Note: Contrary to sources such as Linda Mizejewski, Ross and Cockburn never married due to his extant marriage to Davis.)
- Children: Sarah Caudwell
- Relatives: Olivia Wilde (step-granddaughter)

Jean Iris Ross Cockburn (/ˈkoʊbərn/; 7 May 1911 – 27 April 1973) was a British journalist, political activist, and film critic. A devout Stalinist, she became a lifelong member of the Communist Party of Great Britain, and she worked as a film critic for the Daily Worker. During the Spanish Civil War (1936–39), she served as a war correspondent for the Daily Express and as an alleged press agent for Joseph Stalin's Comintern. Throughout her lifetime, Ross wrote political criticism, anti-fascist polemics, and socialist manifestos for various organisations such as the British Workers' Film and Photo League.

During a youthful sojourn in the Weimar Republic, Ross worked as a nightclub singer in Berlin's lesbian bars and second-rate cabarets while aspiring to become a famous actress. In 1931, she shared lodgings with writer Christopher Isherwood until her eviction due to her sexual activities. Her escapades inspired the heroine and plot of Isherwood's 1937 novella Sally Bowles, collected in Goodbye to Berlin. In the 1937 novella, a British flapper named Sally Bowles moonlights as a chanteuse during the twilight of the Jazz Age. After a series of failed romances, she becomes pregnant and has an abortion facilitated by the narrator. Isherwood based many details on actual events in Ross' personal life, including her abortion. Fearing a libel suit, Isherwood delayed publication of the work until given Ross' explicit permission. Goodbye to Berlin was later adapted into the stage play I Am a Camera and the musical Cabaret.

Although Isherwood never revealed that Ross inspired Sally Bowles until after her death, her former partner Claud Cockburn, who previously abandoned Ross and their daughter, leaked to the press that she inspired the character. After Cabaret gained widespread attention, tabloid reporters hounded Ross with intrusive questions. For the remainder of her life, Ross believed the public association of herself with the naïve and apolitical character of Sally Bowles occluded her lifelong work as a professional writer and political activist. Ross contended the character's political indifference toward fascism more closely resembled Isherwood and his gay friends, many of whom "fluttered around town exclaiming how sexy the storm troopers looked in their uniforms". In 1986, her daughter Sarah Caudwell wrote a newspaper article in an attempt to correct the historical record and to dispel misconceptions about Ross.

In addition to inspiring the character Sally Bowles, the Oxford Dictionary of National Biography and other sources credit Ross as the muse for lyricist Eric Maschwitz's jazz standard "These Foolish Things (Remind Me of You)". Although Maschwitz's estranged wife Hermione Gingold claimed to have inspired the lyrics, Maschwitz contradicted these claims. Maschwitz instead cited memories of a "young love", and most scholars and biographers credit Maschwitz's youthful affair with Ross as inspiring the song.

== Early life and education ==
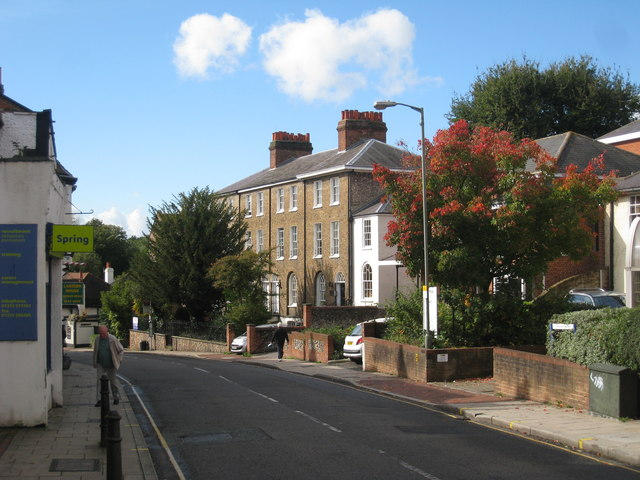
After spending her childhood in the British protectorate of Egypt, Ross received her secondary education at Leatherhead Court in Surrey.

Raised in luxury at Maison Ballassiano in the British protectorate of Alexandria, Egypt, Jean Ross was the eldest daughter of Charles Ross (1880–1938), a Scottish cotton classifier for the Bank of Egypt and brought up with her four siblings in a staunchly liberal, anti-Tory household.

Ross received her secondary education in England at Leatherhead Court, Surrey. An unusually intelligent pupil, she completed the sixth-form curriculum by age 16. She soon grew bored and loathed school. When informed she must remain at school for another year to repeat her already completed coursework, she reacted with open rebellion. To gain her freedom, she feigned a teenage pregnancy, prompting the school's headmistress to summon her for questioning:

Jean remembered standing by the fireplace, feeling the cold marble under her hand while she debated 'for the longest thirty seconds of my life' whether to tell the truth, which would have condemned her to remaining at the school, or lie and suffer the consequences.

She falsely insisted to the headmistress that she was pregnant and the Leatherhead Court schoolmasters sequestered the teenager in a nearby insane asylum until a relative arrived and retrieved her. When the schoolmasters discovered that Ross feigned the pregnancy, they formally expelled her. Exasperated by her defiant behaviour, her parents sent her abroad to Pensionnat Mistral, an elite Swiss finishing school in Neuchâtel. Ross, however, was either expelled or fled the school.

Using a trust stipend provided by her grandfather Charles Caudwell, an affluent industrialist and landowner, Ross traveled to London and enrolled in the Royal Academy of Dramatic Art (RADA). Diligently applying herself in her first year, she won a coveted acting prize that gave her the privilege of choosing the lead role in any production of her choice. When she selected the difficult role of Phaedra, she was informed her youth precluded such a tragic role because she lacked the requisite life experience. Hurt by this refusal, Ross left the academy after one year to pursue a film career.

In 1930, at nineteen years of age, Ross and fellow Egyptian-born Hungarian actor Marika Rökk obtained cinematic roles portraying a harem houri in director Monty Banks' Why Sailors Leave Home, an early sound comedy filmed in London. Ross' dark complexion and partial fluency in Arabic made her suitable for the role. Disappointed with their small roles, she and Rökk heard rumours about ample job opportunities for aspiring actors in the Weimar Republic of Germany and set off with great expectations for Berlin.

== Weimar Berlin ==
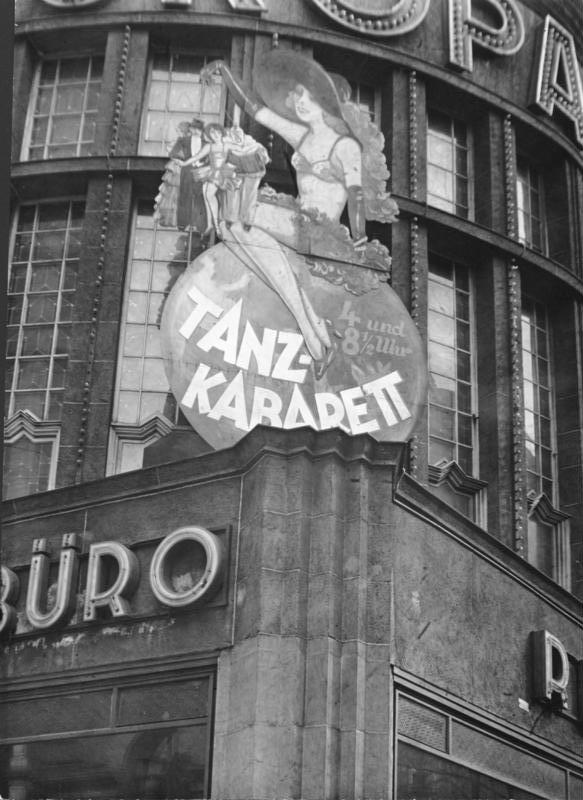

While in Weimar Berlin, Ross sang in lesbian bars and second-rate cabarets.

Ross's excursion to Weimar Germany proved less successful than she hoped. Unable to find acting roles, she found work as a nightclub singer in Berlin's lesbian bars and second-rate cabarets. When not singing or modelling, she visited the casting offices of UFA, a German motion picture production company, in the hopes of obtaining small film roles. By late 1931, she obtained a job as a dancer in theatre director Max Reinhardt's production of Offenbach's opéra fantastique Tales of Hoffmann and played Anitra in Reinhardt's production of Peer Gynt.

Reinhardt's production of Tales of Hoffmann premiered on 28 November 1931. The production became one of the last great triumphs of the Berlin theatre scene prior to the Nazi Party's ascent. Ross and a male dancer appeared together as an amorous couple in the stage background, visible only in silhouette during the second act's Venetian palace sequence. Ross claimed she and the male performer engaged in sexual intimacy in full view of the unsuspecting audience.

=== Isherwood and the Auden Group ===
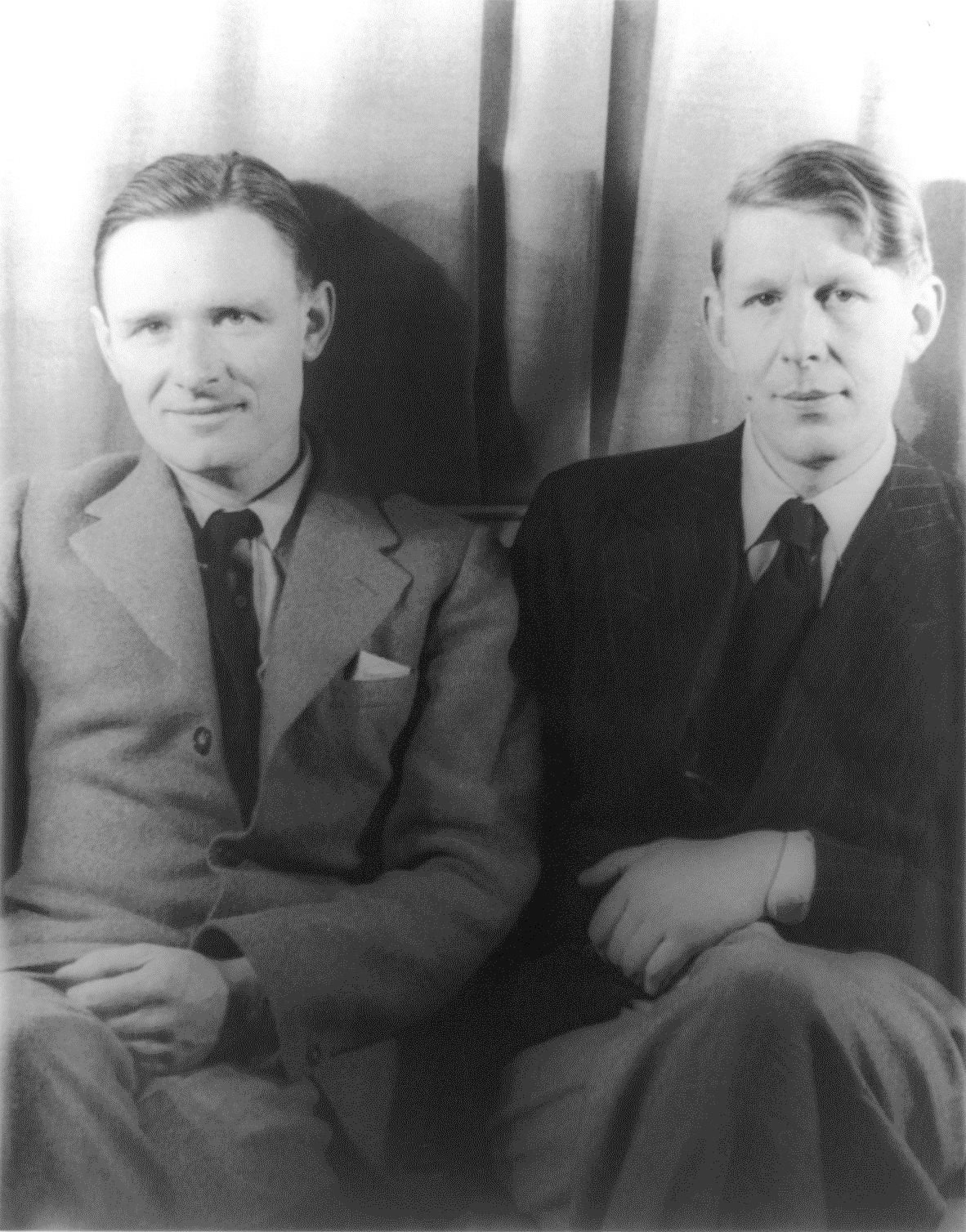
Writer Christopher Isherwood (left) and his friend W. H. Auden (right)

In October 1930, while visiting the apartment of a Hungarian baron, Ross met English writer Christopher Isherwood. Isherwood, still early in his career as a novelist, had moved to Berlin to avail himself of the boy prostitutes found in the city's orgiastic Jazz Age cabarets. At their first meeting, Ross monopolised the conversation and recounted her latest sexual conquests. At one point, she reached into her handbag, retrieved a diaphragm and waved it in the face of a startled Isherwood. The two soon became intimate friends.

By early 1931, Ross and Isherwood shared modest lodgings in Fräulein Meta Thurau's boarding house at Nollendorfstraße 17 in Berlin's Schöneberg quarter. The ramshackle boarding house lay near the epicentre of Weimar Berlin's radical enclaves, subversive activity, and gay nightlife. As roommates, Ross' relations with Isherwood were not always amicable, and they often quarreled. (Note: Stephen Spender described relations between Isherwood and Ross as often acrimonious. Isherwood referred to Ross as "a bitch" for snidely claiming he might one day "write something really great, like Noël Coward".) Isherwood recalled that their landlady, Fräulein Thurau, disliked the untidy Ross who "expected room service" and ordered "people around in an imperious tone, with her English upper-class rudeness".

Ross soon joined Isherwood's social circle in Weimar Berlin, alongside poets W.H. Auden and Stephen Spender. As the only woman in this circle of gay male writers, she became mythologised in their respective memoirs. Isherwood and his circle depicted Ross as a libertine who openly boasted of her sexual relations and entertained visitors to the flat while nude.

Isherwood recalled the young Ross as resembling actress Merle Oberon, albeit with a face possessing the sardonic humour of comedienne Beatrice Lillie, while Spender recalled Ross' "clothes dishevelled, her eyes large onyxes fringed by eyelashes like enamelled wire, in a face of carved ivory". A contemporary portrait of Ross appears in Isherwood's Berlin stories when the narrator first encounters the "divinely decadent" Sally Bowles:

I noticed that her fingernails were painted emerald green, a colour unfortunately chosen, for it called attention to her hands, which were much stained by cigarette smoking and as dirty as a little girl's. She was dark ... Her face was long and thin, powdered dead white. She had very large brown eyes which should have been darker, to match her hair and the pencil she used for her eyebrows.

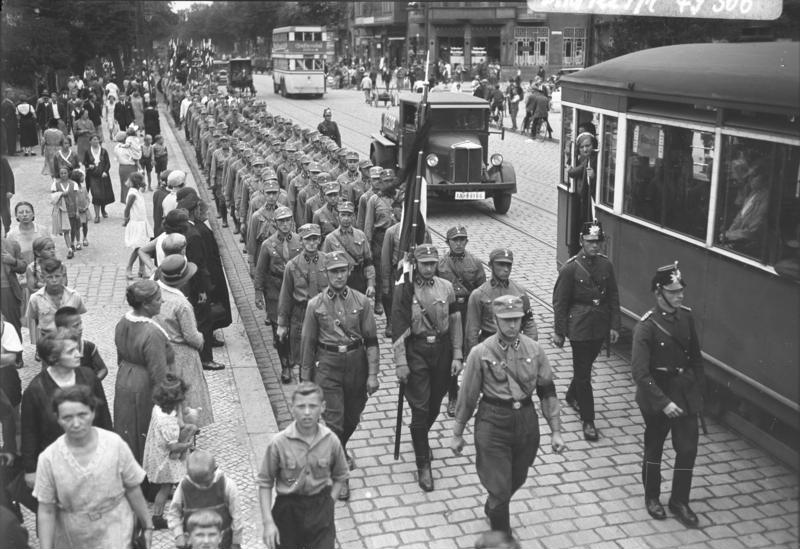
A parade of Nazi brownshirts in Weimar Berlin in 1932. By the time Ross fled Berlin, such parades became a regular occurrence.

While rooming with Isherwood at Nollendorfstraße, Ross continued to work by day as a fashion model for popular magazines and by night as a bohemian chanteuse singing in the nearby cabarets located along the Kurfürstendamm avenue, an entertainment-vice district selected for future destruction by Nazi politician Joseph Goebbels in his 1928 journal. When the Nazi Party seized power in early 1933, the Brownshirts forcibly closed these venues. Isherwood visited these seedy nightclubs to hear Ross sing, and he described her singing voice as poor yet nonetheless effective:

She had a surprisingly deep, husky voice. She sang badly, (Note: Peter Parker notes that Ross believed "Isherwood 'grossly underrated' her singing abilities, but her family agreed that this was one aspect of Sally Bowles that Isherwood got absolutely right".) without any expression, her hands hanging down at her sides—yet her performance was, in its own way, effective because of her startling appearance and her air of not caring a curse of what people thought of her.

Due to her friendship with Isherwood, Ross became immortalised as "a bittersweet English hoyden" named Sally Bowles in Isherwood's 1937 eponymous novella and his 1939 book Goodbye to Berlin. He derived the character's surname from Paul Bowles, a bisexual American author who gained acclaim for his post-colonial novel The Sheltering Sky. Isherwood purportedly introduced Ross to Paul Bowles when the American writer visited Berlin, and this meeting made an impression on Isherwood. Although Isherwood modelled Bowles on Ross, he remarked that Ross seemed "more essentially British" than the character, citing her toughness and "grin-and-bear-it" demeanor.

=== Near-fatal abortion ===
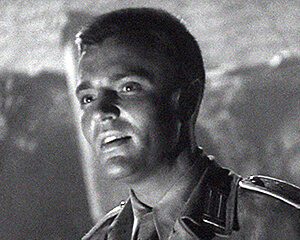
Actor Peter van Eyck in Five Graves to Cairo (1943). The brief liaison between Van Eyck and Ross and her subsequent abortion inspired Isherwood's 1937 novella Sally Bowles.

Amid the economic and political turmoil of the Weimar Republic, Ross and Isherwood embarked on a variety of sexual escapades. While Isherwood occasionally had sex with women, Ross—unlike the fictional character Sally—never seduced him, although they shared a bed whenever their flat became overcrowded with visitors. Instead, a 27-year-old Isherwood solicited boy prostitutes and began sexual relations with a 16-year-old German boy named Heinz Neddermeyer.

While her roommate Isherwood spent his time pursuing boys, Ross engaged in a series of sexual flings, including one with 19-year-old musician Götz von Eick, (Note: Isherwood based the character of Klaus Linke in Goodbye to Berlin on van Eyck.) who adopted the stage name Peter van Eyck and starred in Henri-Georges Clouzot's The Wages of Fear. Although some biographers identify van Eyck as Jewish, others describe him as the scion of Prussian landowners. His family expected him to pursue a military career, but he became interested in jazz and studied music in Berlin. When van Eyck met Ross, he moonlighted as a cabaret pianist.

Either during their brief relations or soon after separation, Ross realised she was pregnant. As a favour to Ross, Isherwood pretended to be her impregnator to facilitate an abortion. Ross nearly died from complications arising from the procedure due to the doctor's incompetence. Visiting the ailing Ross in a hospital, Isherwood felt hostility from the hospital staff who believed that he had forced her to undergo the abortion. These events inspired Isherwood's 1937 novella Sally Bowles.

=== Leaving Germany ===
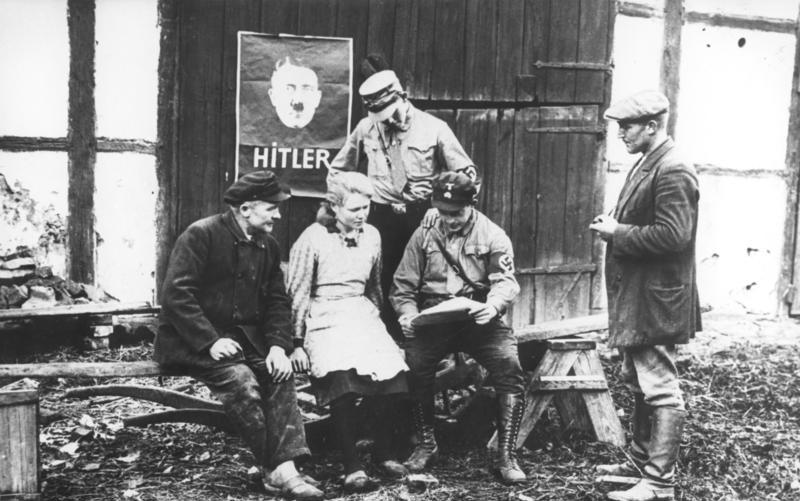
Nazis campaigning in the elections of July 1932. The Nazis becoming the largest party in Reichstag prompted Ross to leave Germany in August 1932.

During Ross' recovery from the botched abortion, the political situation rapidly deteriorated in Weimar Germany as the incipient Nazi Party continued to grow stronger day by day. By 1932, Weimar Germany descended into the trough of a severe economic depression with millions of persons unemployed. Nearly every German encountered by Ross, Isherwood, and Spender lived "from hand to mouth on little money". Berliners experienced "poverty, unemployment, political demonstrations and street fighting between the forces of the extreme left and the extreme right".

As the political climate deteriorated, Ross and Spender realised they must leave Germany. "There was a sensation of doom to be felt in the Berlin streets", Spender recalled. In the July 1932 elections, the Nazis became the largest party in the Reichstag, though not a majority. By August that year, Ross departed Germany and returned to southern England. (Note: Streamlining events in a 1977 interview, Isherwood inaccurately said Ross went from Germany to Spain to join the Spanish Civil War. This is incorrect. Ross returned to England and then went to Spain.) Despite Ross leaving Germany, Isherwood chose to remain due to his attachment to Heinz Neddermeyer.

After Adolf Hitler's ascension as Chancellor of Germany in January 1933, Isherwood finally realised that staying any longer in Germany would be perilous. "Adolf, with his rectangular black moustache, has come to stay", he wrote to a friend, "Nazis are to be enrolled as 'auxiliary police,'... One must now not only be murdered but that it is illegal to offer any resistance." After the Enabling Act cemented Hitler's power, Isherwood fled Nazi Germany with Heinz Neddermeyer on 13 May 1933, traveling initially to Greece. Many of the Berlin residents whom Ross and Isherwood befriended fled abroad or perished in labour camps.

== Activism in London ==
=== Joining the Communist Party ===
There is nothing in his [Isherwood's] portrait of Sally [Bowles] to suggest that she might have any genuine ability as an actress, still less as a writer. My mother [Jean Ross], on the other hand, was at least talented enough as an actress to be cast as Anitra in Max Reinhardt's production of Peer Gynt and competent enough as a writer to earn her living, not long afterwards, as a scenario-writer and journalist.

— Sarah Caudwell, "Reply to Berlin", October 1986

After her return to southern England in August 1932, Ross resided at Cheyne Walk in Chelsea, London, and continued to fraternise with Isherwood and his circle of friends. She also began to associate with left-wing political activists "who were humorous but dedicated, sexually permissive but politically dogmatic". During this period, she met Claud Cockburn, an Anglo-Scots journalist and the second cousin, once removed, of novelists Alec Waugh and Evelyn Waugh.

Ross and Cockburn met at the Café Royal. (Note: Gerald Hamilton hypothesised Jean Ross and Claud Cockburn met as far back as Berlin in 1930. Other sources state Ross and Cockburn did not meet until after Ross moved back to London.) At their first meeting, Cockburn gave Ross a bad cheque but, having second thoughts, telephoned her the next morning to warn that it would bounce. Despite this "portent of unreliability" and "the fact that Cockburn had already been married to an American woman whom he left when she became pregnant", Ross began an affair with Cockburn. On a subsequent evening, Cockburn expounded on Marxism to Ross all night until the early morning. He secured her employment as a journalist at the Daily Worker.

Due to Cockburn's influence, Ross joined the Communist Party of Great Britain (CPGB) during the tenure of General Secretary Harry Pollitt. She became an active Party member for the remainder of her life. Meanwhile, she continued her career as an aspiring thespian, appearing in theatrical productions at the Gate Theatre Studio directed by Peter Godfrey and, in need of money, she modelled the latest Paris fashions by French designer Jean Patou in Tatler magazine. It is possible, although unlikely, (Note: Isherwood wrote that Ross never travelled to the United States during her lifetime. As such, she could not have filmed Rumba (1935) in Hollywood. She is perhaps wrongly credited as having a role in the film.) that she obtained a bit role in Paramount Studios' musical drama film Rumba.

=== Isherwood and Sally Bowles ===
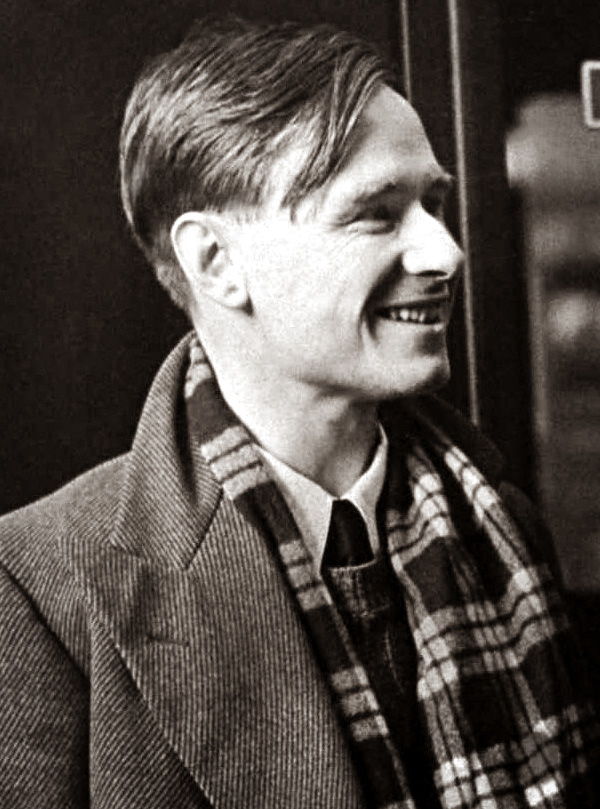
Christopher Isherwood in 1938. Ross arranged for Isherwood to be hired by director Berthold Viertel, which launched his career as a Hollywood screenwriter.

In London, Ross' connections to the British film industry proved crucial to Isherwood's future career. Her fluency in German enabled her to work as a bilingual scenarist with Austro-German directors who had fled the Nazi regime. One of these directors, Berthold Viertel, became Ross' friend. Aware of Isherwood’s financial hardship, Ross persuaded Viertel to hire the struggling author as a translator.

As repayment for persuading Viertel to hire Isherwood, Ross asked Isherwood to give her half of his first week's salary. Isherwood either reneged on or forgot this agreement with Ross, and this incident likely contributed to the souring of their friendship. Viertel and Isherwood soon collaborated on the 1934 film, Little Friend, launching Isherwood's career as a screenwriter.

In 1933, Isherwood began composing a story about Ross' escapades and her abortion in Berlin that became his novella Sally Bowles. He eventually sent the manuscript to editor John Lehmann to be published in New Writing, a literary periodical. When Isherwood informed Lehmann that his story drew on factual events, Lehmann feared that Ross would file a libel suit against both Isherwood and himself if the story appeared in print.

As abortion remained controversial and carried the penalty of life imprisonment, Ross feared the thinly-disguised story would further strain her relations with her family. Isherwood persuaded Ross to allow the novella's publication. Hogarth Press published the work in 1937. Ross regretted the decision, believing the work damaged her reputation "among those comrades" who recognised her as "the model for Sally Bowles".

=== Workers' League and embezzlement ===
Around 1934 and 1935, Ross wrote a manifesto for the short-lived British Workers' Film and Photo League (BWFPL) and served as its General Secretary. Much like its communist-backed U.S. counterpart, the BWFPL sought to launch a cultural counter-offensive to the "bourgeois" and "nauseating" films produced in capitalist societies such as the United States and the United Kingdom. The organisation sought to circulate anti-capitalist revolutionary films among workers' organisations across the country.

Despite its limited personnel and modest funds, the League produced newsreels, taught seminars on working-class film criticism, organised protests against "reactionary pictures", and screened the latest blockbusters of Soviet Russia to cadres of like-minded cineastes. The BWFPL screened such motion pictures as Storm over Asia (1928), Ten Days That Shook the World (1928), Road to Life (1931), and China Express (1929).

During Ross' tenure as General Secretary, the BWFLP maintained close ties to the Friends of the Soviet Union and often sublet its office space to the organisation. After resigning as the League's Secretary, Ross continued to serve as a League member and produced the short film Defence of Britain in March 1936. Drawing on her family's resources, Ross donated a considerable sum to the fledgling organisation in February 1936. Another League member, Ivan Seruya, embezzled the majority of Ross' donation to finance his own private venture, International Sound Films. This incident and the subsequent dearth of organisational funds reportedly contributed to the League's lack of progress and to its demise in 1938.

=== Film criticism for the Daily Worker ===
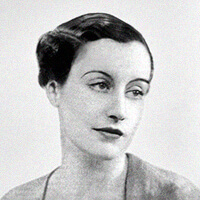
Ross circa the 1940s

Between 1935 and 1936, Ross worked as a film critic for the Communist newspaper Daily Worker under the alias Peter Porcupine, a name adopted as a homage to radical English pamphleteer William Cobbett, who used the same pseudonym. Ross' interest in film criticism began in Weimar Berlin, where she attended the cinema with Isherwood, Auden, and Spender. They viewed such films as Robert Wiene's The Cabinet of Dr. Caligari, Fritz Lang's Metropolis, and Josef von Sternberg's The Blue Angel. They adored "heroic proletarian films" such as G.W. Pabst's Comradeship as well as "Russian films in which photography created poetic images of labour and industry", such as Ten Days That Shook the World and The Battleship Potemkin.

In her film criticism, Ross stated that "the workers in the Soviet Union [had] introduced to the world" new variations of this art form with "the electrifying strength and vitality and freedom of a victorious working class". Film scholar Peter Hutchings characterized one of her reviews of early Soviet cinema as an "ingenious piece of dialectical sophistry."

=== Eve of the Spanish Civil War ===
English poet and anti-fascist John Cornford in January 1936, eleven months prior to his death in the Spanish Civil War.

Since its inception Ross had been a member / attendee at meetings of Writers and Artists International co-ordinating with her work with the Photo League. In September 1936, during the first year of the Spanish Civil War, Ross met John Sommerfield at the Horseshoes pub in England, accompanied by his friend English poet John Cornford. (Note: Portraits of Jean Ross and John Cornford appear in John Sommerfield's autobiographical 1977 work The Imprinted. This work is a memoir with facts and fiction interwoven. An intimate friend of Cornford, Sommerfield fought in the Spanish Civil War alongside him.) As the first English volunteer to enlist against Francisco Franco's forces, Cornford had just returned from the Aragon front, where he served with the POUM militia near Zaragoza and fought in battles near Perdiguera and Huesca. Cornford then travelled back to England from Barcelona to recruit volunteers to combat the fascists in Spain.

At the initial meeting between Ross and Cornford, (Note: John Sommerfield recalled meeting Ross in his autobiographical memoir The Imprinted. He described her as "a dark, slim girl, stylishly dressed, not like most of the girls we used to meet". She spoke in a well-mannered style and "gave out a sort of high class sexiness that made you feel there was something special about her, that she was a prize".) a near brawl occurred at the pub when an ex-fascist volunteer from the Irish Brigade confronted Cornford, and the two nearly came to blows over the war. Leaving the pub, Cornford, Ross, and Sommerfield went to dinner at Bertorelli's on Charlotte Street in Fitzrovia, central London. Ross impressed Cornford with her knowledge of ongoing political matters in Spain, as well as between England and Germany. By the end of the evening, Cornford and Ross began a romance.

In the weeks before his return to Spain, Cornford possibly stayed at Ross' apartment. During this period, Sommerfield received a letter from Cornford: "After John had walked down Charlotte Street with Jean, he disappeared for several weeks. Then I had a letter, saying he'd moved in with Jean, and would I come round for a meal. 'She's a good cook, too,' he wrote. I liked that 'too'." Visiting them, Sommerfield noted Ross' love for Cornford: "She seemed positively besotted, watching him all the time, eating him up with her eyes". If such a romance occurred, it lasted mere weeks, cut short by their commitment to fighting Franco in Spain.

== War correspondent ==
=== Arrival in Republican Spain ===
[Ross] may well, at 19, have been less informed about politics than Isherwood, five or six years older; but, when the Spanish war came and the fascists were bombing Madrid, it was she, not Isherwood, who was there to report it.

— Sarah Caudwell, "Reply to Berlin", October 1986

In late September 1936, Ross travelled to war-torn Spain either in the company of Claud Cockburn or separately. (Note: Peter Parker claims Ross was "on holiday with [Claud] Cockburn in Spain when the civil war broke out" and that they "stayed there as reporters".) Meanwhile, Cornford returned to Spain with 21 British volunteers to fight the fascists and became the de facto representative of International Brigades' British contingent. He served with a mitrailleuse unit and fought in the Battle of Madrid in November and December 1936. During the battle for University City of Madrid, a stray anti-aircraft shell wounded him. Despite his injuries, Cornford served with the English-speaking volunteers of the Marseillaise Brigade. He was killed in action at Lopera near Córdoba on 27 or 28 December.

Upon hearing of Cornford's death, a devastated Ross may have attempted to kill herself with an overdose of sleeping pills. Decades later, she confided to her acquaintance John Sommerfield during a private conversation that Cornford "was the only man I ever loved". The death of her many friends in the service of the doomed Republican cause likely solidified Ross' anti-fascist sentiments, (Note: In a 1974 interview with James Day, Isherwood said Ross' commitment to Marxism occurred after her sojourn in Berlin and was "the one subject on which she was a bit boring because she echoed the [Stalinist] party line".) and she remained in Republican Spain throughout the prolonged conflict as a war correspondent for the Daily Express.

=== Journalist and propagandist ===
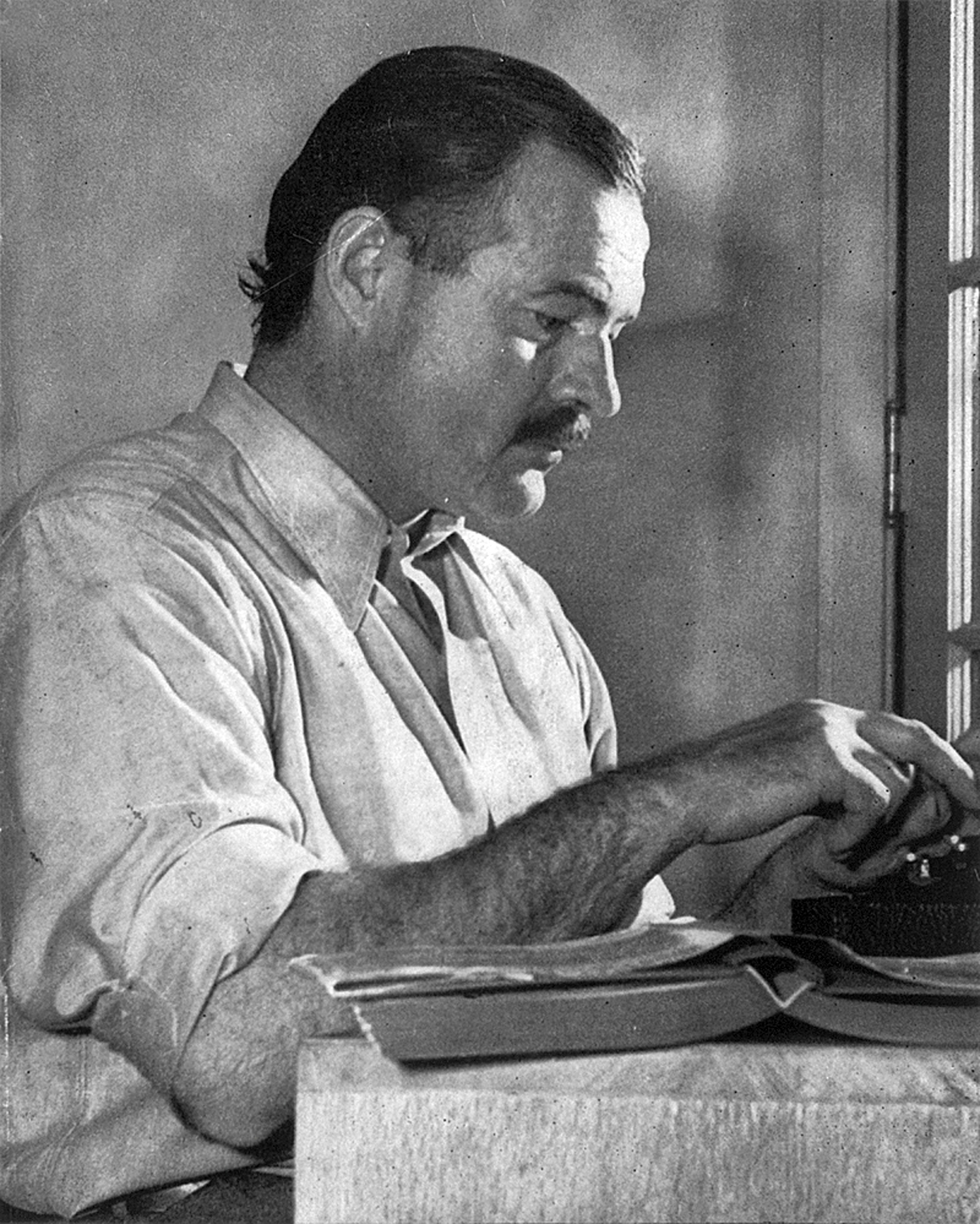
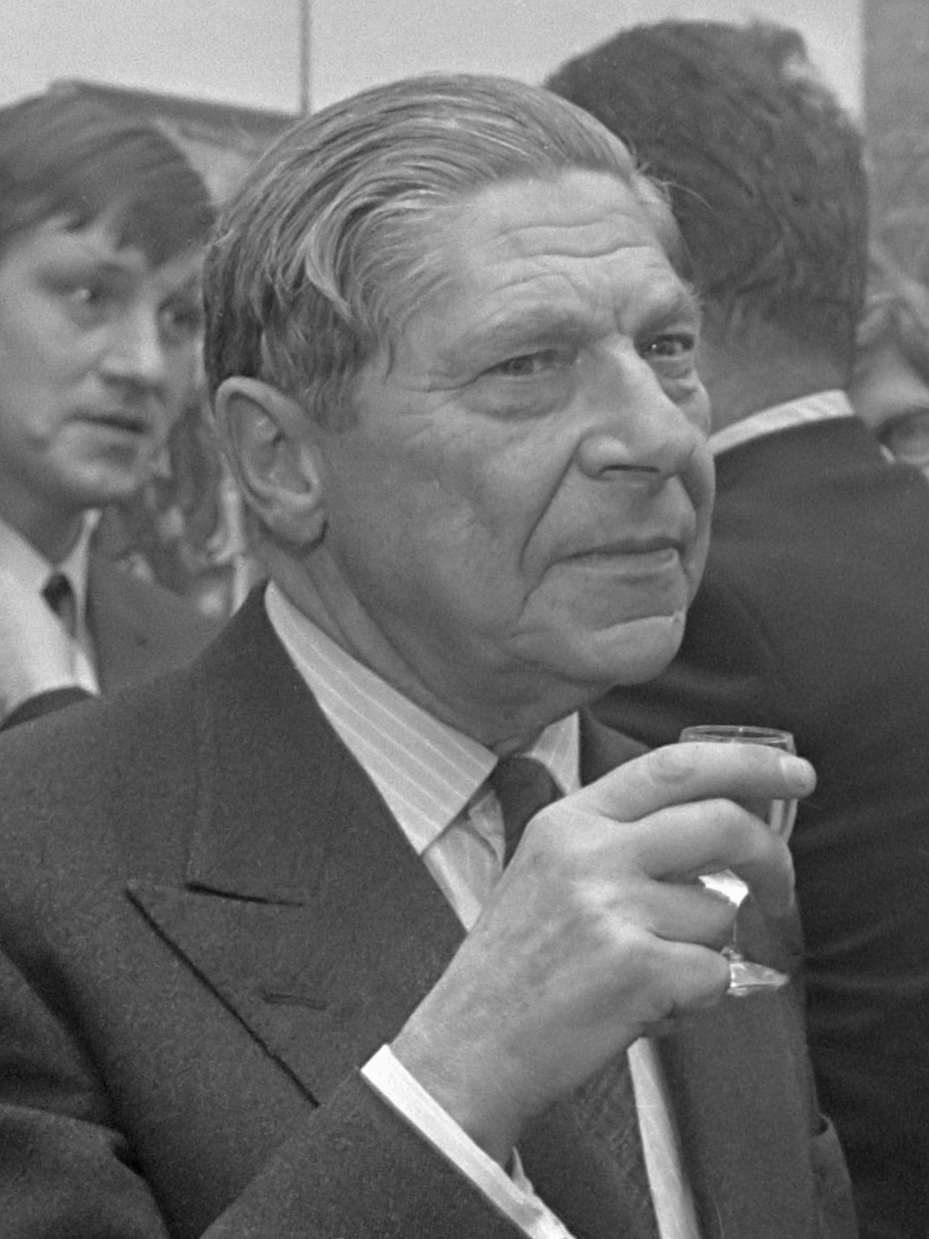
During the Spanish Civil War, Ross worked alongside journalists Ernest Hemingway (left) and Arthur Koestler (right) in besieged Madrid.

Throughout the Spanish Civil War, Ross worked for the London branch office of the Espagne News-Agency ("Spanish News Agency"). The agency's entire staff, including Ross, served as loyal operatives of the Comintern apparatus, the international Communist organization dedicated to creating a worldwide Soviet republic. Ross' fellow Comintern propagandists included Hungarian journalist Arthur Koestler, Willy Forrest, Kitty Bowler, Milly Bennett of the Moscow Daily News, and Claud Cockburn. (Note: Using the alias Frank Pitcairn, Claud Cockburn reported on the Spanish Civil War for the Daily Worker and became its Foreign Editor. He became a key figure in the British Communist Party and the Comintern of Western Europe.) By this time, Cockburn was a prominent member of the British Communist Party. Within five years, he would become a leader of the Comintern in Western Europe.

During Ross' tenure at the agency, journalist George Orwell accused the organization of operating as a Stalinist apparatus that disseminated false propaganda to undermine anti-Stalinist factions on the Republican side of the conflict. (Note: According to George Orwell, the Espagne News-Agency published false stories about anti-Stalinist anarchists secretly executed by the NKVD in Spain. The agency reported that Andrés Nin—who had been tortured and executed by the NKVD—had escaped to a fascist sanctuary.) Amid the Barcelona May Days, when Stalinist-backed troops annihilated anarchist factions on the Republican side, Orwell alleged the Espagne News-Agency and the Daily Worker published false claims to justify their extermination by asserting that the anarchists planned a coup and secretly allied themselves with the fascists.

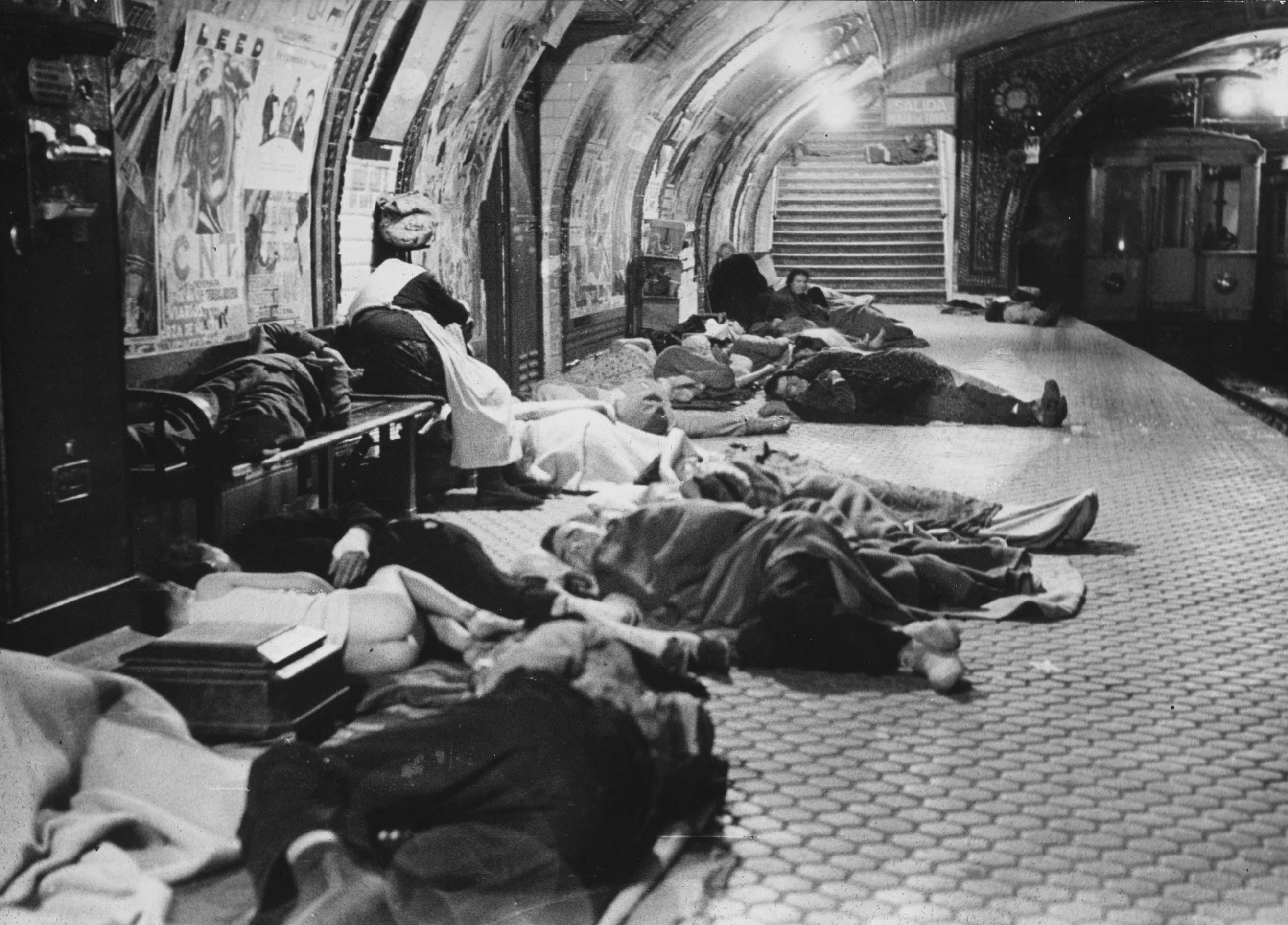
Ross reported from Madrid under bombardment by Franco's forces. Many of Madrid's inhabitants sought shelter in the subway to escape the bombs.

While covering the Spanish Civil War for the Daily Worker in 1936, Cockburn had joined the elite Fifth Regiment of the left-wing Republicanos battling the right-wing Nacionales and, when not fighting, he gave sympathetic coverage to the Communist Party. (Note: George Orwell criticized Cockburn in Homage to Catalonia (1938). Orwell accused him of being under the control of Stalin and criticized his reporting of the Barcelona May Days. Cockburn's close friend, Mikhail Koltsov, worked as a Kremlin operative and as the foreign editor of Pravda.) As Cockburn fought with the Fifth Regiment, Ross served as a war correspondent for the Daily Express. When Cockburn remained at the front lines, Ross ghostwrote his columns and submitted the pieces to the Daily Worker under his name while continuing to send her reports to the Express.

Ross embedded herself with Republican defenders in Madrid. Other foreign correspondents in besieged Madrid included Herbert Matthews of The New York Times, Ernest Hemingway of the North American Newspaper Alliance, Henry Tilton Gorrell of United Press International, Vera Elkan of the Progressive Film Institute and Martha Gellhorn of Collier's, as well as Josephine Herbst. All of the foreign correspondents often dined together in the ruined basement of Gran Via, the sole restaurant open in besieged Madrid during its relentless bombardment by fascist troops. Armed sentries guarded the basement restaurant and did not permit entry without a press pass.

=== Reporting on the Southern Front ===
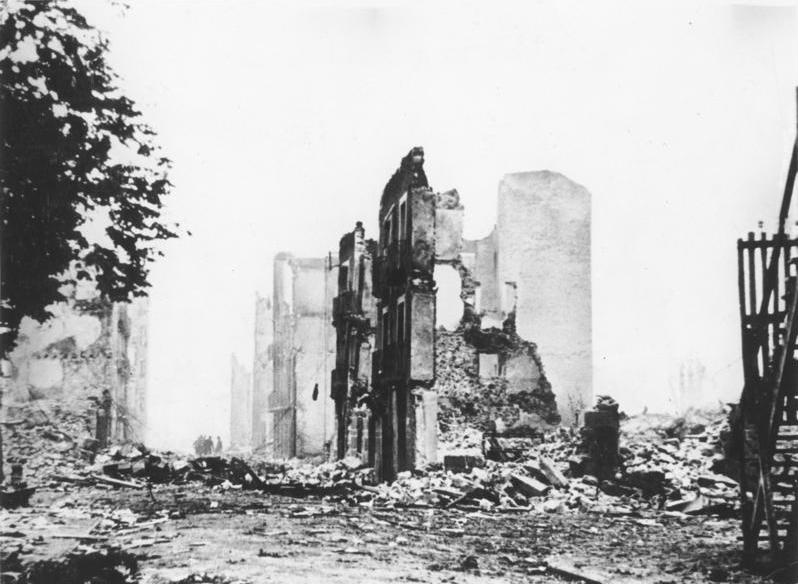
As a war correspondent, Ross travelled across Andalusia with Richard Mowrer, the stepson of Hemingway's first wife Hadley Richardson. Ross endured many aerial bombardments without air raid shelters. The bombardments reduced the cities to rubble akin to Guernica (pictured above).

In early 1937, as the civil war progressed, Ross, her friend Richard Mowrer of The Chicago Daily News—the stepson of Ernest Hemingway's first wife Hadley Richardson (Note: Richard Mowrer, the son of Paul Mowrer, became the first journalist to receive the Pulitzer Prize for Correspondence in 1929. After her divorce from Ernest Hemingway, Hadley Richardson married Paul Mowrer and became the stepmother to his son Richard. Ernest's son Jack Hemingway became Richard's step-brother.)—and Republican press official Constancia de la Mora travelled to Andalusia to report on the southern front. Together, Ross, Mowrer, and de la Mora reported on war-time conditions in Alicante, Málaga, and Jaén.

Shortly before her arrival at Jaén, a squadron of German Junkers Ju 52 aircraft from the Condor Legion bombed the Republican city. The aerial attack killed 159 civilians and injured several hundred others, on a scale similar to the bombing of Guernica four weeks later. Amid the rubble, Ross reported on the death toll and interviewed survivors, including mothers whose children died in the bombardment. She proceeded to Andújar where, amid the ongoing battle and machine-gun fire, she interviewed Colonel José Morales, a Republican commander of the southern armies.

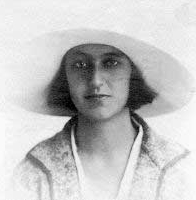
Constancia de la Mora

Following her interview with Colonel Morales, the convoy in which Ross travelled faced recurrent enemy fire and came under bombardment by a fascist air patrol. In her autobiography In Place of Splendor, de la Mora recalled this bombing as one of the daily perils that Ross and other journalists endured to report news from the front lines:

In the dusk, I saw Mowrer and Jean Ross running down the road. I began to run. The sound of the planes, the low roar of the motors, filled my ears and head and heart and throat. I ran faster and faster ... Suddenly the whole mountain exploded with a noise so hideous, so vast, that the ear was not shaped to comprehend it. The ground where I lay trembled I felt it move against my body. The sound began to diminish ... Jean Ross and Mowrer came down the road. We made jokes.

In Andújar, Ross endured nine aerial bombardments by German Junkers and survived each despite the lack of air raid shelters. Recalling these events, Mora described Ross as a fearless reporter who resigned herself to death and looked "as natural as possible" when the bombs fell. Her acquaintances noted Ross possessed "a comforting air of calmness about her". For the next year, Ross reported from the fronts at Córdoba and Extremadura. She continued reporting on the war, often from the front lines of the Republican forces.

=== Fall of Madrid and return to England ===
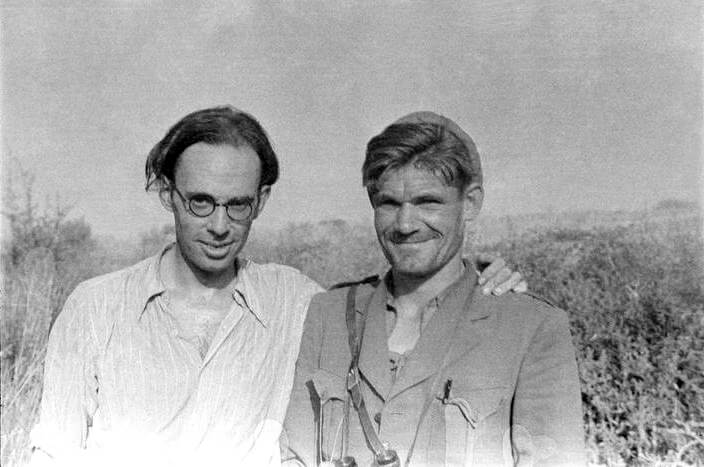
Claud Cockburn with whom Ross had a child, Sarah Caudwell. In August 1939, three months after their daughter's birth, Cockburn abandoned Ross and their child.

In late 1938, while pregnant with Claud Cockburn's child, Ross witnessed the final months of the Siege of Madrid and endured aerial bombardment by Francoist forces. By the time the besieged city fell to the Nationalist armies on 28 March 1939, Ross had escaped to England. Her wartime experiences, especially the atrocities she witnessed and the friends she lost in combat, solidified her lifelong commitment to anti-fascist resistance.

Sixty days after the fall of Madrid, Ross gave birth to Cockburn's daughter, Sarah Caudwell, on 27 May 1939. Some sources claim Ross did not marry Cockburn due to her beliefs about women's emancipation, but under British law, Cockburn remained married to his first wife Hope Hale Davis; he could not marry Ross at that time without committing bigamy. Whether Ross previously knew of Cockburn's marriage to Davis remains unknown. Several months before her daughter's birth, Ross filed a deed poll changing her surname to Cockburn.

In 1938 or 1939, Cockburn began a clandestine sexual relationship with Patricia Arbuthnot. In August 1939, Cockburn abandoned Ross and their newly born child to live with Arbuthnot. Cockburn omitted all mention of Ross from his memoirs. Following her abandonment by Cockburn, Ross did not have another recorded partner. She told an acquaintance that "having a man around was like having a crocodile in the bath".

== Later life and death ==
=== Second World War and post-war years ===
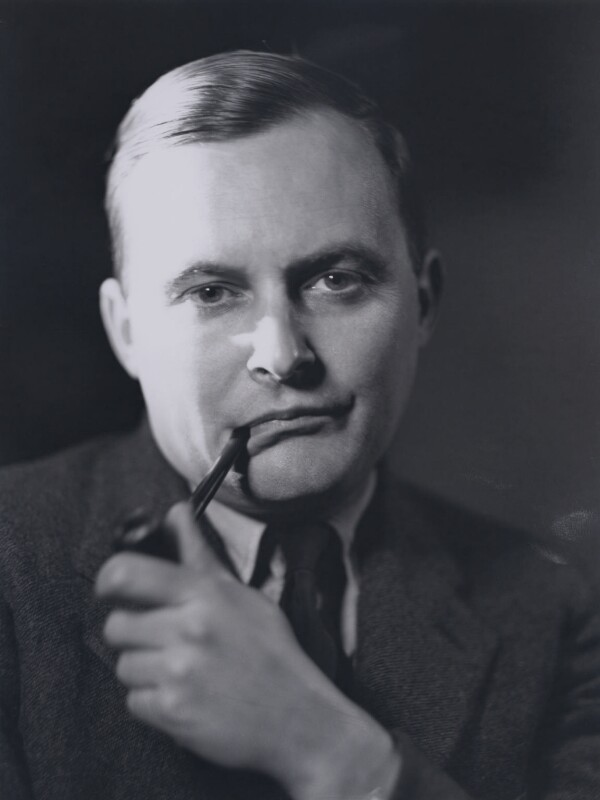
Edward Upward

Shortly before the outbreak of the Second World War and the London Blitz, Ross, her daughter Sarah, and her widowed mother Clara Caudwell moved to Hertfordshire. Ross became friends with Isherwood's old acquaintance Edward Upward and his wife Hilda Percival, both socialists. Upward later met Olive Mangeot at a Communist Party meetings, and the two began an extramarital affair. Olive, whom Isherwood depicted as Marvey Scriven in The Memorial and as Madame Cheuret in Lions and Shadows, eventually separated from her husband Andre Mangeot and lived in the London suburbs at Gunter Grove, Barnet, where she invited Ross and her daughter Sarah to live with her.

For many years, Ross and Sarah lived as Olive's boarders in modest circumstances in Gunter Grove. Much like Ross, Mangeot had been an apolitical bohemian in her youth and transformed with age into a devout Stalinist who sold the Daily Worker and was an active member of various left-wing circles. According to Isherwood, Mangeot, Ross, and their social circle refused to consort with Trotskyists or other communist schismatics who strayed from the Stalinist party line.

=== Parenthood and socialist activities ===
Sarah Caudwell, Jean Ross' daughter and only child

For the remainder of her life, Ross devoted herself to advancing the ideology of socialism and raising her daughter, Sarah. To obtain the most advantageous education available for Sarah, Ross moved to Scotland. In 1960, they moved to Barnes, London, for Sarah to attend Oxford University. They lived with Jean's invalid sister Margaret "Peggy" Ross, a sculptor and painter who trained at the Liverpool School of Art.

Ross became the caretaker for both Peggy, whose severe arthritis limited her mobility, and for her mother, Clara, who suffered debilitating effects from a stroke. Under Ross' tutelage, Sarah became one of the first women students to join the Oxford Union and to speak in the Oxford Union's Debating Chamber. She taught law at Oxford, rose to senior executive at Lloyds Bank, and gained acclaim as an author of detective novels.

In the final decades of her life, Ross continued to engage in political activities, including protesting nuclear weapons, boycotting apartheid South Africa, and opposing the Vietnam War. She sold copies of the Daily Worker to neighbours and raised awareness of ongoing political campaigns. By this time, she had few clothes and little money. Acquaintances who met Ross noted that hardships and poverty had taken a toll. Sommerfield recalled:

She seemed burned out ... with bruise marks under her eyes and lines of discontent round her mouth; her once beautiful black hair looked dead, and she wore too much make-up, carelessly applied. Only her voice was the same, a rapid, confiding drawl full of italics. She was still using the slang and political cliches of her youth, and trying to shock with a freedom of speech that now was taken for granted.

=== Reunion with Isherwood ===
Ross and Isherwood met a final time shortly before her death. In a diary entry for 24 April 1970, Isherwood recounted their final reunion in London:

I had lunch with Jean Ross and her daughter Sarah [Caudwell], and three of their friends at a little restaurant in Chancery Lane. Jean looks old but still rather beautiful and she is very lively and active and mentally on the spot—and as political as ever ... Seeing Jean [again] made me happy; I think if I lived here I'd see a lot of her that is—if I could do so without being involved in her communism.

On 27 April 1973, Ross died at her home in Richmond, Surrey, aged 61, from cervical cancer. She was cremated at East Sheen.

== Dislike of Sally Bowles and Cabaret ==
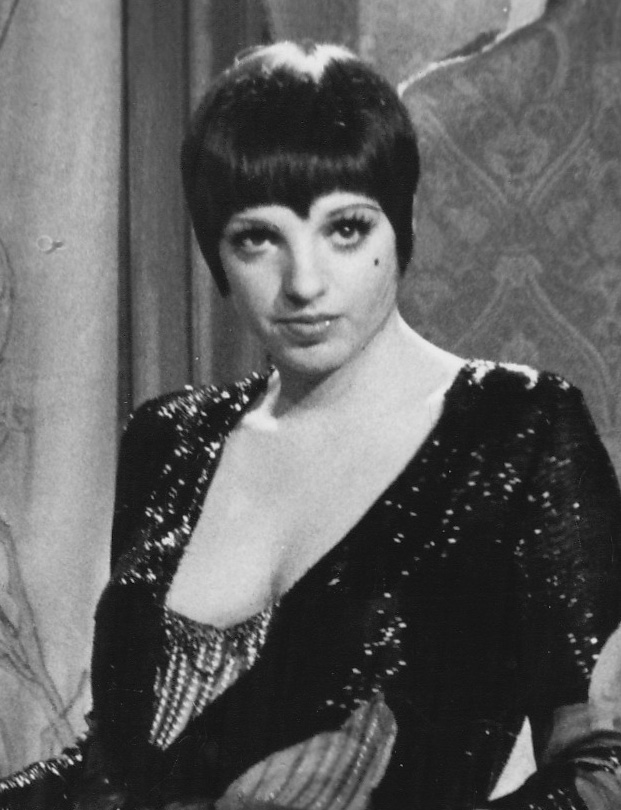
Liza Minnelli as Sally Bowles in the 1972 film Cabaret.

Ross disliked her popular identification with the vacuous character of Sally Bowles and declined to watch Cabaret or any related adaptations. In 1986, her daughter Sarah Caudwell wrote that Ross believed the character's political indifference more closely resembled Isherwood and his gay friends, many of whom "fluttered around town exclaiming how sexy the storm troopers looked in their uniforms". Biographer Peter Parker confirms this claim, describing Isherwood as "the least political" member of W. H. Auden's social circle in Weimar Berlin, and Auden himself lamented that the young Isherwood "held no opinions whatever about anything."

Ross particularly resented Isherwood's depiction of her fictional alter-ego as antisemitic. In the 1937 novella, Bowles laments having sex with an "awful old Jew" to obtain money. Caudwell wrote such racial bigotry "would have been as alien to my mother's vocabulary as a sentence in Swahili; she had no more deeply rooted passion than a loathing of racialism and so, from the outset, of fascism." Given her hatred of fascism, Ross reacted with indignation that Isherwood depicted her as thoughtlessly allied with beliefs "that led to Dachau and Auschwitz". Biographer Peter Parker reveals the antisemitic remarks by Sally Bowles likely reflected Isherwood's own prejudices. (Note: In an article for The New York Review of Books, writer Gore Vidal notes Isherwood's inordinate preoccupation with racial matters. In contrast to Isherwood, Ross demonstrated a strong commitment to racial equality.) In the wake of World War II and the Holocaust, Isherwood's antisemitism prompted editors to revise his Berlin novels in postwar republications, removing such objectionable elements.

Caudwell also disputed claims about Ross' sexual exhibitionism. However, biographers affirm the factual basis of these anecdotes. "Although Ross later claimed that she was not really like Sally Bowles," Parker states, "most of the more outlandish anecdotes Isherwood used in his portrait were based on fact." Additionally, other acquaintances confirmed Ross' sexual exhibitionism, including entertaining guests in the nude. Ross herself conceded the accuracy of Isherwood and herself as pleasure-seeking libertines: "We were all utterly against the bourgeois standards of our parents' generation. That's what took us to Berlin. The climate was freer there". Her daughter nevertheless objected that Isherwood's fictionalised depiction employed a literary convention that necessitated "a woman must be either virtuous... or a tart. So Sally, who is plainly not virtuous, must be a tart to depend for a living on providing sexual pleasure". Isherwood, however, rejected such interpretations. In a letter to John Van Druten, Isherwood wrote that Sally is not a tart but "a little girl who has listened to what the grown-ups had said about tarts, and who was trying to copy those things".

[Ross] never liked Goodbye to Berlin, nor felt any sense of identity with the character of Sally Bowles ... She never cared enough, however, to be moved to any public rebuttal. She did from time to time settle down conscientiously to write a letter, intending to explain to Isherwood the ways in which she thought he had misunderstood her; but it seldom progressed beyond 'Dear Christopher ...' It was interrupted, no doubt, by more urgent things: meetings about Vietnam, petitions against nuclear weapons, making my supper, hearing my French verbs. It was in Isherwood's life, not hers, that Sally Bowles remained a significant figure.

— Sarah Caudwell, "Reply to Berlin", October 1986

Isherwood never publicly identified Ross as the model for Sally Bowles until after her death. Others proved less discreet. Ross insisted her former partner, Claud Cockburn, who previously abandoned Ross and their daughter, first leaked to the press that she inspired the character. In 1951, poet Stephen Spender confirmed in his autobiography that Ross inspired the character and that the novella's abortion incident reflected real events. In 1969, Gerald Hamilton, the inspiration for Isherwood's character Mr. Norris, again identified Ross as Sally Bowles. (Note: In a 1954 newspaper column, journalist Claud Cockburn publicly outed Gerald Hamilton as the basis for Mr. Norris in Isherwood's stories. In turn, Hamilton identified Ross—Cockburn's ex-partner and the mother of his child—as the basis for Sally Bowles. According to Isherwood, Ross insisted that Cockburn first revealed her identity to the press.)

After Claud Cockburn's revelations to the press, reporters—particularly those from the Daily Mail—hounded Ross with intrusive questions. Their questions often led to "disappointment on both sides" as the reporters wanted to discuss sex, while Ross wanted to discuss politics. Ross observed the reporters pretended to seek knowledge about 1930s Berlin yet showed no interest in its poverty, unemployment, or "Nazis marching through the streets," focusing instead on "how many men I went to bed with". Ross became annoyed when they ascribed her promiscuity to her feminist beliefs: "They asked if I was a feminist. Well, of course I am, darling. But they don't think that feminism is about sex, do they? It's about economics".

== Portrayals and legacy ==
=== Isherwood canon ===
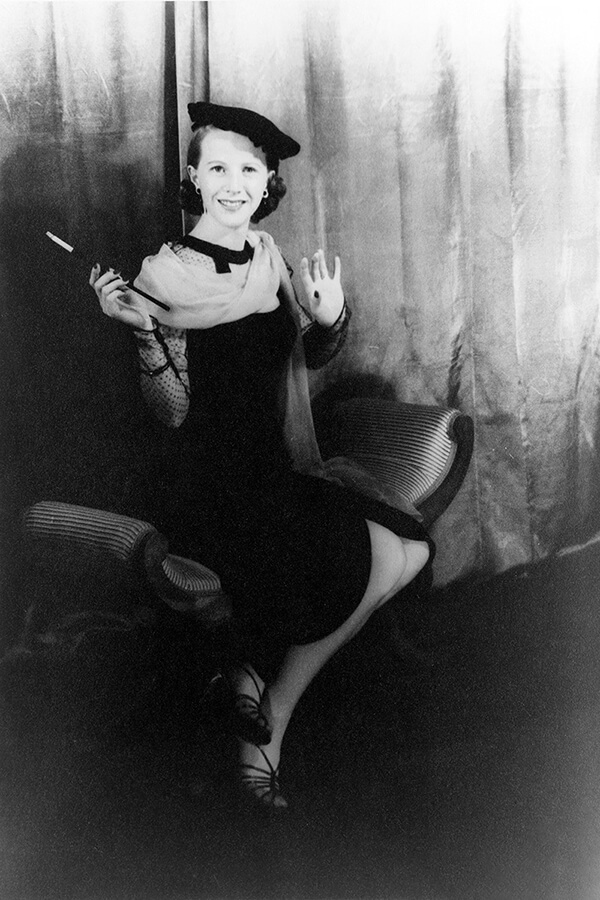
Julie Harris as Sally Bowles

Sally Bowles, the fictional character inspired by Ross, has been portrayed by a number of actors: Julie Harris in I Am a Camera, the 1951 adaptation of Goodbye to Berlin and the 1955 film adaptation of the same name; Jill Haworth in the original 1966 Broadway production of Cabaret; Judi Dench in the 1968 West-End stage version of Cabaret; Liza Minnelli in Bob Fosse's 1972 film adaptation of the musical, and Natasha Richardson in the 1998 Broadway revival.

In 1979, critic Howard Moss examined the character's remarkable longevity over many decades: "It is almost fifty years since Sally Bowles shared the recipe for a Prairie oyster with Herr Issyvoo in a vain attempt to cure a hangover" and yet the character in subsequent permutations lives on "from story to play to movie to musical to movie-musical". Moss ascribed the character's enduring appeal to an aura of sophisticated innocence, as well as to the revisionist depiction of Weimar Berlin as not ugly or unseemly but instead as a genial milieu.

According to critic Ingrid Norton, Sally Bowles inspired the character of Holly Golightly in Truman Capote's 1958 novella Breakfast at Tiffany's. Norton contends that Isherwood's Bowles served as a key model for Capote's character, and she notes many scenes and dialogue exchanges in Capote's novella have equivalencies to Isherwood's 1937 work. Capote admired Isherwood's novels and befriended him in New York during the late 1940s.

=== Christopher and His Kind (2011) ===
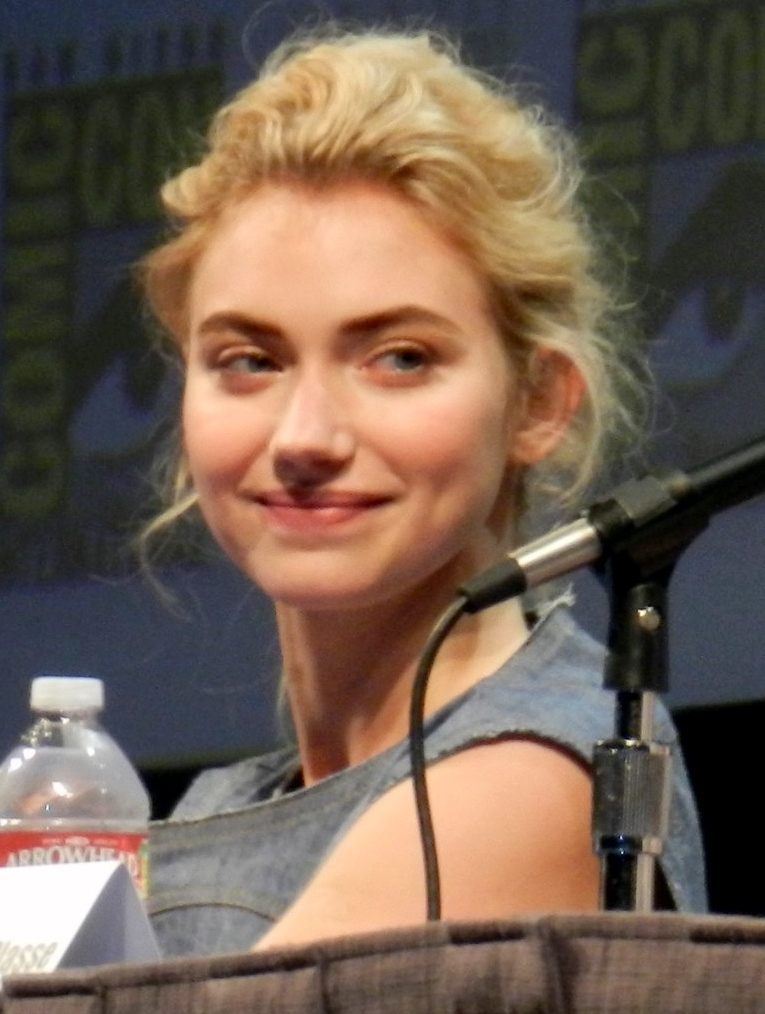
Imogen Poots portrayed Ross in BBC's 2011 television film Christopher and His Kind.

In 2011, British actor Imogen Poots portrayed Jean Ross in Christopher and His Kind, in which she starred opposite Matt Smith as Christopher Isherwood. For her performance, Poots attempted to show Ross' personality as "convincingly fragile beneath layers of attitude" but did not wish to depict Ross as a talented singer. Poots said if "Jean had been that good, she wouldn't have been wasting her time hanging around with Isherwood in the cabarets of the Weimar Republic, she would have been on her way, perhaps, to the life she dreamed of in Hollywood".

=== These Foolish Things ===
As well as inspiring Sally Bowles, Ross has been credited as the inspiration for the jazz standard, "These Foolish Things (Remind Me of You)". Although its composer Eric Maschwitz's wife Hermione Gingold said her autobiography the song was written for either herself or actor Anna May Wong, Maschwitz's own autobiography contradicts that of Gingold. Maschwitz cites "fleeting memories of [a] young love" as the inspiration for the song, and most sources—including the Oxford Dictionary of National Biography—say cabaret singer Ross, with whom Maschwitz had a youthful romantic liaison, was the muse for the song.
