= Christopher and His Kind =

1976 memoir by writer Christopher Isherwood

- 1976 edition cover
- Author: Christopher Isherwood
- Language: English
- Genre: Autobiography
- Publisher: Farrar, Straus and Giroux
- Publication date: 1976
- Pages: 339
- ISBN: 0-8166-3863-2
- OCLC: 2439517

Christopher and His Kind is a 1976 memoir by Anglo-American writer Christopher Isherwood, first printed in a 130-copy edition by Sylvester & Orphanos, then in general publication by Farrar, Straus & Giroux. In the text, Isherwood candidly expounds upon events in his life from 1929 to 1939, including his sojourn in Berlin which was the inspiration for his popular 1939 novel Goodbye to Berlin.

== Background ==
Isherwood decided late in his life that he had a moral obligation to renounce the self-censorship that marked his early novels, specifically the excision of any hint of his homosexuality. Accordingly, in Christopher and His Kind, he recounts his experiences as a young gay expatriate enticed by the liberated atmosphere of Weimar Berlin into a quest for sexual and intellectual emancipation.

To earn a living Christopher offers English lessons. One of his students is Bernhard Landauer (loosely based on the businessman and philanthropist Wilfrid Israel), the wealthy Jewish owner of a department store. He entreats Christopher to take a political stand against Nazism but Christopher, as an artist, initially demurs. Herr Landauer's home is ransacked by the Nazis and they lead a boycott against his and other Jewish-owned businesses. As portrayed in the 2011 film adaptation, Christopher last sees Wilfrid when their eyes sorrowfully meet over a bonfire of books the Nazis are burning.

Isherwood posits that his homosexuality, far from a marginal private shame to be suppressed, was a central element in his human and creative development, an identity he cherished and shared with many others ("my tribe", "my kind") with whom he felt a special kinship. This candid autobiography was, in Isherwood's view, the way to discharge the obligation he felt due to "his kind", and thus make his own contribution to the cause of gay liberation.

== Reception ==
In his review of Isherwood's memoir, critic Peter Stansky noted that Christopher and His Kind unmasks Isherwood as "a good deal less dedicated to political passion than the legend has had it." Stansky asserted the memoir revealed Isherwood to be a politically indifferent hedonist whose outlook on life closely resembled his fictional character of Sally Bowles. In particular, Isherwood's "remark that the 'original' of Sally Bowles 'wasn't a victim, wasn't proletarian, was a mere self-indulgent upper middle class foreign tourist who could escape from Berlin when she chose,' comes perilously close to describing his own situation."

== Adaptation ==
A television film, Christopher and His Kind, directed by Geoffrey Sax, and starring Matt Smith as Isherwood and Imogen Poots as Jean Ross, debuted in 2011.
