= Mr Norris Changes Trains =

1935 novel by Christopher Isherwood

- First edition
- Author: Christopher Isherwood
- Language: English
- Publisher: Hogarth Press
- Publication date: 1935
- Pages: 280
- OCLC: 1160132
- Followed by: Goodbye to Berlin (1939)

Mr Norris Changes Trains (published in the United States as The Last of Mr. Norris) is a 1935 novel by the British writer Christopher Isherwood. It is frequently included with Goodbye to Berlin, another Isherwood novel, in a single volume, The Berlin Stories. Inspiration for the novel was drawn from Isherwood's experiences as an expatriate living in Berlin during the early 1930s, and the character of Mr Norris is based on Gerald Hamilton. In 1985 the actor David March won a Radio Academy Award for Best Radio Actor for his performance in a dramatisation of the novel for BBC Radio 4.

Isherwood began work on a much larger work he called The Lost before paring down its story and characters to focus on Norris. The book was critically and popularly acclaimed but years after its publication Isherwood denounced it as shallow and dishonest.

== Plot summary ==
The novel follows the movements of William Bradshaw, its narrator, who meets a nervous-looking man named Arthur Norris on a train going from the Netherlands to Germany. As they approach the frontier William strikes up a conversation with Mr Norris, who wears an ill-fitting wig and carries a suspect passport.

William and Mr Norris succeed in crossing the frontier. Afterward, Mr Norris invites William to dinner and the two become friends. In Berlin they see each other frequently (including eating ham and eggs at the first class restaurant of Berlin Friedrichstraße railway station). Several oddities of Mr Norris's personal life are revealed, one of which is that he is a masochist. Another is that he is a communist, which is dangerous in Hitler-era Germany. Other aspects of Mr Norris's personal life remain mysterious. He seems to run a business with an assistant Schmidt, who tyrannises him. Norris gets into more and more straitened circumstances and has to leave Berlin.

Norris subsequently returns with his fortunes restored and apparently conducting communication with an unknown Frenchwoman called Margot. Schmidt reappears and tries to blackmail Norris. Norris uses Bradshaw as a decoy to get an aristocratic friend of his, Baron Pregnitz, to take a holiday in Switzerland and meet "Margot" under the guise of a Dutchman. Bradshaw is urgently recalled by Ludwig Bayer (based on Willi Münzenberg) one of the leaders of the communist groups, who explains that Norris was spying for the French and both his group and the police know about it. Bradshaw observes they are being followed by the police and persuades Norris to leave Germany. After the Reichstag fire, the Nazis eliminate Bayer and most of Norris's comrades. Bradshaw returns to England where he receives intermittent notes and postcards from Norris, who has fled Berlin, pursued by Schmidt. The novel's last words are drawn from a postcard that Mr Norris sends to William from Rio de Janeiro: "What have I done to deserve all this?"

== Background and composition ==
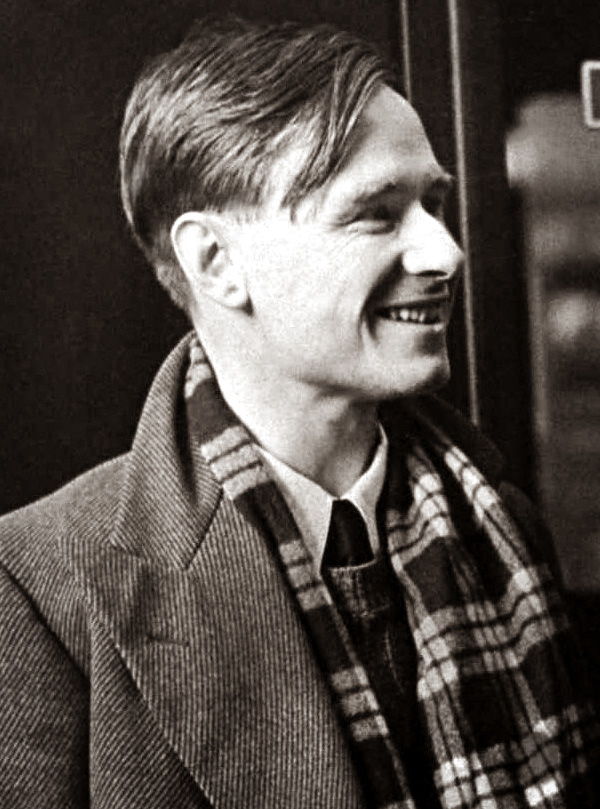
Christopher Isherwood

Isherwood originally intended to call this novel The Lost, a title he conceived in German, Die Verlorenen. The title The Lost would have encompassed three different meanings: "those who have lost their way", by which he meant Germans who were being misled by Adolf Hitler; "the doomed", those like the character Bernard Landauer whom Hitler had already marked for destruction; and "those whom respectable Society regards as moral outcasts", like the characters Sally Bowles, Otto Nowak and Mr Norris himself. Isherwood began writing the book in 1934, while he and his companion Heinz Neddermayer were living in the Canary Islands. The Lost was initially planned as a much more comprehensive work, but Isherwood jettisoned much of the material and many of the characters, including Sally Bowles, the Nowaks and the Landauers, to focus on Mr Norris. This process he likened to the surgery performed to separate Siamese twins, "freeing Norris from the stranglehold of his brothers and sisters". The excised material formed the basis for the rest of his Berlin Stories. He completed work on the novel on 12 August of that year.

Initially Isherwood planned to write the novel in the third person, but when he decided to narrow the novel's focus to Norris he changed to first person. He believed that this would allow the reader to "experience" Mr Norris as Isherwood had experienced Gerald Hamilton.

The name of the narrator, William Bradshaw, is drawn from Isherwood's full name, Christopher William Bradshaw Isherwood. In subsequent novels Isherwood changed the narrator's name to "Christopher Isherwood", having come to regard "William Bradshaw" as a "foolish evasion". Isherwood did not explicitly claim that he was William Bradshaw although the novel describes Isherwood's own experiences. He sought to make the narrator as unobtrusive as possible so as to keep readers focused on Norris. Although Isherwood was living more or less openly as a homosexual, he balked at making Bradshaw homosexual as well. In part this was to help the average reader identify with the narrator by minimising the differences between the narrator and the reader. Not to do so meant that "The Narrator would have become so odd, so interesting, that his presence would have thrown the novel out of perspective. ... The Narrator would have kept upstaging Norris's performance as the star." Isherwood's decision had a more pragmatic reason as well; he had no desire to cause a scandal and feared that should he cause one his uncle, who was financially supporting him, would cut him off. Yet Isherwood had no interest in making Bradshaw heterosexual either, so the Narrator has no scenes of a sexual nature.

The novel was still titled The Lost when Isherwood mailed the manuscript to Hogarth Press for publication, but the title was eventually changed to Mr Norris Changes Trains. Isherwood meant to evoke with that title not only Norris's continual moves from country to country to avoid his enemies and creditors, but also his constantly shifting political alliances and interests. Isherwood's friend Stephen Spender preferred the original title, saying of the new one that "It gives one the sense of earrings." An employee at William Morrow and Company, Isherwood's American publisher, told Isherwood that no one in the United States would understand the term "changes trains" and so Isherwood supplied the alternate title The Last of Mr Norris. "He thereby created the false impression that these are two different novels, one the sequel to the other. Which ... led to much wearisome correspondence with readers, setting the record straight."

== Isherwood's reevaluation ==
Although Mr Norris Changes Trains was a critical and popular success, Isherwood later condemned it, believing that he had lied about himself through the characterisation of the narrator and that he did not truly understand the suffering of the people he had depicted. In his introduction to an edition of Gerald Hamilton's memoir Mr Norris and I (1956) Isherwood wrote:

What repels me now about Mr Norris is its heartlessness. It is a heartless fairy-story about a real city in which human beings were suffering the miseries of political violence and near-starvation. The "wickedness" of Berlin's night-life was of the most pitiful kind; the kisses and embraces, as always, had price-tags attached to them, but here the prices were drastically reduced in the cut-throat competition of an over-crowded market. ... As for the "monsters", they were quite ordinary human beings prosaically engaged in getting their living through illegal methods. The only genuine monster was the young foreigner who passed gaily through these scenes of desolation, misinterpreting them to suit his childish fantasy.
