= Goodbye to Berlin =

1939 novel by Christopher Isherwood

- The cover of the first edition
- Author: Christopher Isherwood
- Genre: Tragedy
- Published: March 1939
- Publisher: Hogarth Press
- Publication place: United Kingdom
- Media type: Print (Hardback & Paperback)
- Pages: 317
- OCLC: 5437385
- Preceded by: Mr Norris Changes Trains (1935)

Goodbye to Berlin is a 1939 novel by English-American writer Christopher Isherwood set during the waning days of the Weimar Republic. The novel recounts Isherwood's 1929–1932 sojourn in Berlin as a pleasure-seeking British expatriate on the eve of Adolf Hitler's ascension as Chancellor of Germany. The work consists of a "series of sketches of disintegrating Berlin, its slums and nightclubs and comfortable villas, its odd maladapted types and its complacent burghers." Isherwood drew many plot details from factual events and based the novel's characters on actual persons. Jean Ross, a 19-year-old flapper who briefly shared lodgings with Isherwood, inspired Sally Bowles, one of the novel's characters.

During Isherwood's time abroad in Germany, the young author witnessed the country's rapid political and social unraveling. He saw extreme "poverty, unemployment, political demonstrations and street fighting between the forces of the extreme left and the extreme right." Following the Enabling Act that cemented Hitler's power in March 1933, Isherwood fled Germany and returned to England. Afterwards, the Nazis shuttered Berlin's cabarets, (Note: Many Berlin cabarets located along the Kurfürstendamm avenue, an entertainment-vice district, had been marked for future destruction by Joseph Goebbels as early as 1928.) and many of Isherwood's friends fled abroad or perished in concentration camps. These events served as the genesis for Isherwood's Berlin stories.

The novel received positive reviews from critics and writers. Anne Margaret Angus praised Isherwood's mastery in conveying the despair of Berlin's denizens and "their hopeless clinging to the pleasures of the moment". She believed Isherwood skillfully evoked "the psychological and emotional hotbed which forced the growth of that incredible tree, 'national socialism'." George Orwell hailed the novel for its "brilliant sketches of a society in decay". "Reading such tales as this," Orwell wrote, "the thing that surprises one is not that Hitler came to power, but that he did not do so several years earlier."

New Directions collected the 1939 novel together with Isherwood's 1935 novel, Mr Norris Changes Trains, in a 1945 omnibus edition titled The Berlin Stories. Critics praised the collection as capturing the bleak nihilism of the Weimar period. In 2010, Time magazine named it one of the 100 best English-language works of the 20th century. The work inspired the 1951 Broadway play I Am a Camera, the 1966 musical Cabaret, and the 1972 film of the same name. According to critics, the novel's character Sally Bowles inspired Truman Capote's character Holly Golightly in his 1958 novella Breakfast at Tiffany's.

== Plot summary ==
I am a camera with its shutter open, quite passive, recording, not thinking...

— Christopher Isherwood, A Berlin Diary, Autumn 1930

I thought of Natalia: she has escaped—none too soon, perhaps. However often the decision may be delayed, all these people are ultimately doomed. This evening is the dress-rehearsal of a disaster. It is like the last night of an epoch.

— Christopher Isherwood, Goodbye to Berlin (1939)

After relocating to Weimar-era Berlin to work on a novel, an English writer explores the decadent nightlife of the city and becomes enmeshed in the colourful lives of a diverse array of Berlin denizens. He acquires modest lodgings in a boarding house owned by Fräulein Schroeder, a caring landlady.

At the boarding house, he interacts with the other tenants, including the brazen prostitute Fräulein Kost, who has a Japanese patron, and the decadent Sally Bowles, a young English flapper who sings tunelessly in a seedy cabaret called "The Lady Windermere". Due to a mutual lack of funds, Christopher and Sally soon become roommates, (Note: Relations between Isherwood and Ross were not always amicable, and they often quarrelled. Stephen Spender claimed relations between Isherwood and Ross were often acrimonious, and Isherwood referred to Ross as "a bitch" for snidely claiming he might one day "write something really great, like Noël Coward".) and he learns a great deal about her sex life as well as her coterie of "marvelous" lovers. When Sally becomes pregnant after a tryst, Christopher facilitates an abortion, and the painful incident draws them closer together. (Note: Isherwood wrote in 1976 that, "in real life, Jean and Christopher had a relationship which was asexual but more truly intimate than the relationships between Sally and her various partners in the novel, the plays and the films".) When he visits Sally at the hospital, the hospital staff assume he is Sally's impregnator and despise him for forcing her to have an abortion.

During the summer, Christopher resides at a beach house near the Baltic Sea with Peter Wilkinson and Otto Nowak. Peter has spent years in therapy when he meets the 16-year-old Otto, who assures Peter that he can cheer him up more than a therapist can and for less money. Peter falls in love with Otto and becomes possessive; Otto appears bisexual, but it is clear he prefers the girls he dances with in town to Peter. Otto demonstrates little affection for Peter and increasingly desires independence, making Peter jealous and unhappy. Eventually, the two split: Otto escapes back to Berlin and Peter returns to his native England. Christopher too returns to Berlin.

During this time, Christopher meets teenage Natalie Landauer whose wealthy Jewish family owns a department store. After the Nazis smash the windows of several Jewish shops, Christopher learns that Natalie's cousin Bernhard is dead, likely murdered by the Nazis. Ultimately, Christopher is forced to leave Germany as the Nazis continue their ascent to power, and he fears that many of his beloved Berlin acquaintances are now dead.

== Major characters ==
- Christopher Isherwood – an English writer who visits Berlin and becomes entangled in the lives of various locals. The character is based upon the author. Isherwood specifically relocated to poverty-stricken Berlin to avail himself of underage male prostitutes, and he was politically indifferent about the rise of fascism. Jean Ross claimed that Sally Bowles' political indifference more closely resembled Isherwood himself and his hedonistic male friends, many of whom "fluttered around town exclaiming how sexy the storm troopers looked in their uniforms". Ross' opinion of Isherwood's political indifference was confirmed by Isherwood's acquaintance W. H. Auden who noted the young Isherwood "held no [political] opinions whatever about anything".
- Sally Bowles – a British cabaret singer with whom Christopher briefly shares a small Nollendorfstrasse flat. She has a number of sexual liaisons, becomes pregnant, and undergoes an abortion. The character was based upon 19-year-old flapper Jean Ross. Like Ross, Sally attended the exclusive Leatherhead School in Surrey, England, and she hailed from a wealthy family. According to Isherwood, Sally should not be either viewed or interpreted as "a tart." Instead, Sally "is a little girl who has listened to what the grown-ups had said about tarts, and who was trying to copy those things".
- Fräulein Schroeder – a plump German landlady who owns the boarding house where Christopher and Sally reside. The character was based upon Fräulein Meta Thurau. According to Isherwood, Thurau "was tremendously intrigued by [Jean Ross'] looks and mannerisms, her makeup, her style of dressing, and above all, her stories about her love affairs. But she didn't altogether like Jean. For Jean was untidy and inconsiderate; she made a lot of extra work for her landladies. She expected room service and sometimes would order people around in an imperious tone, with her English upper-class rudeness".

Frl. Schroeder [the landlady] is consolable... It's no use trying to explain to her, or talking politics. Already she is adapting herself, as she will adapt herself to every new regime. This morning I even heard her talking reverently about 'Der Fuhrer'... If anybody were to remind her that, at the elections last November, she voted Communist, she would probably deny it... Thousands of people like Frl. Schroeder are acclimatising themselves.

— Christopher Isherwood, Goodbye to Berlin (1939)
- Otto Nowak – a handsome, gamine teenage boy whose family hosts Christopher after he returns from his vacation on the Baltic Sea. Otto was based on bisexual teenager Walter Wolff who had been born in eastern Germany prior to its transfer to Poland after the Treaty of Versailles. Unwilling to become Polish citizens, Walter and his family moved to the Berlin slums after World War I. Although irrepressibly merry, Wolff was described by Isherwood as an incorrigible narcissist who cared little about the feelings of the men and women who pursued him.
- Peter Wilkinson – an English expatriate who sexually pursues Otto Nowak and then departs Germany due to Otto's flirtations with other men. The character was partly based on William Robson-Scott, a lecturer in English at Berlin University. Robson-Scott "was at this time homosexual and, according to Isherwood, occasionally paid boys to beat him." As three family members had died before he turned 15-years-old, Robson-Scott was "deeply apprehensive about life, believing that if one loved somebody the natural consequence of this would be their death."
- Natalie Landauer – an earnest young Jewish woman whose affluent family pays Christopher for English lessons. Natalie's cousin Bernhard is murdered, presumably by Nazi street thugs. The character was loosely based on Gisa Soleweitschick. According to Soleweitschick, her mother had discerned quickly that Isherwood was "not interested in girls" and, accordingly, she trusted him as her daughter's unchaperoned companion. However, Gisa herself did not realise that Isherwood was gay, and she attributed his lack of sexual advances to his "fine English manners."
- Klaus Linke – an itinerant musician who impregnates Sally and is based upon Peter van Eyck. Although some biographers identify van Eyck as Jewish, (Note: Critic David Thomson and writer Peter Parker assert that Peter van Eyck was Jewish. Others contend van Eyck was a Pomeranian aristocrat. The character of Klaus Linke in Isherwood's Goodbye to Berlin is based upon van Eyck.) others posit van Eyck was the wealthy scion of Prussian landowners in Pomerania. As an aristocrat, he was expected by his family to embark upon a military career but he became interested in jazz as a young man and pursued musical studies in Berlin.
- Clive – a wealthy playboy based upon American expatriate John Blomshield who inspired the enigmatic character of Baron Maximilian von Heune in the 1972 film adaptation. According to contradictory sources, Blomshield sexually pursued both Isherwood and Ross for a short while in Berlin, and he invited them to accompany him on a trip abroad to the United States. When they had agreed to go, he then abruptly disappeared without saying goodbye. Blomshield bluntly terminated his relationships in the same manner that Clive ends his affair with Sally.

== Biographical context ==
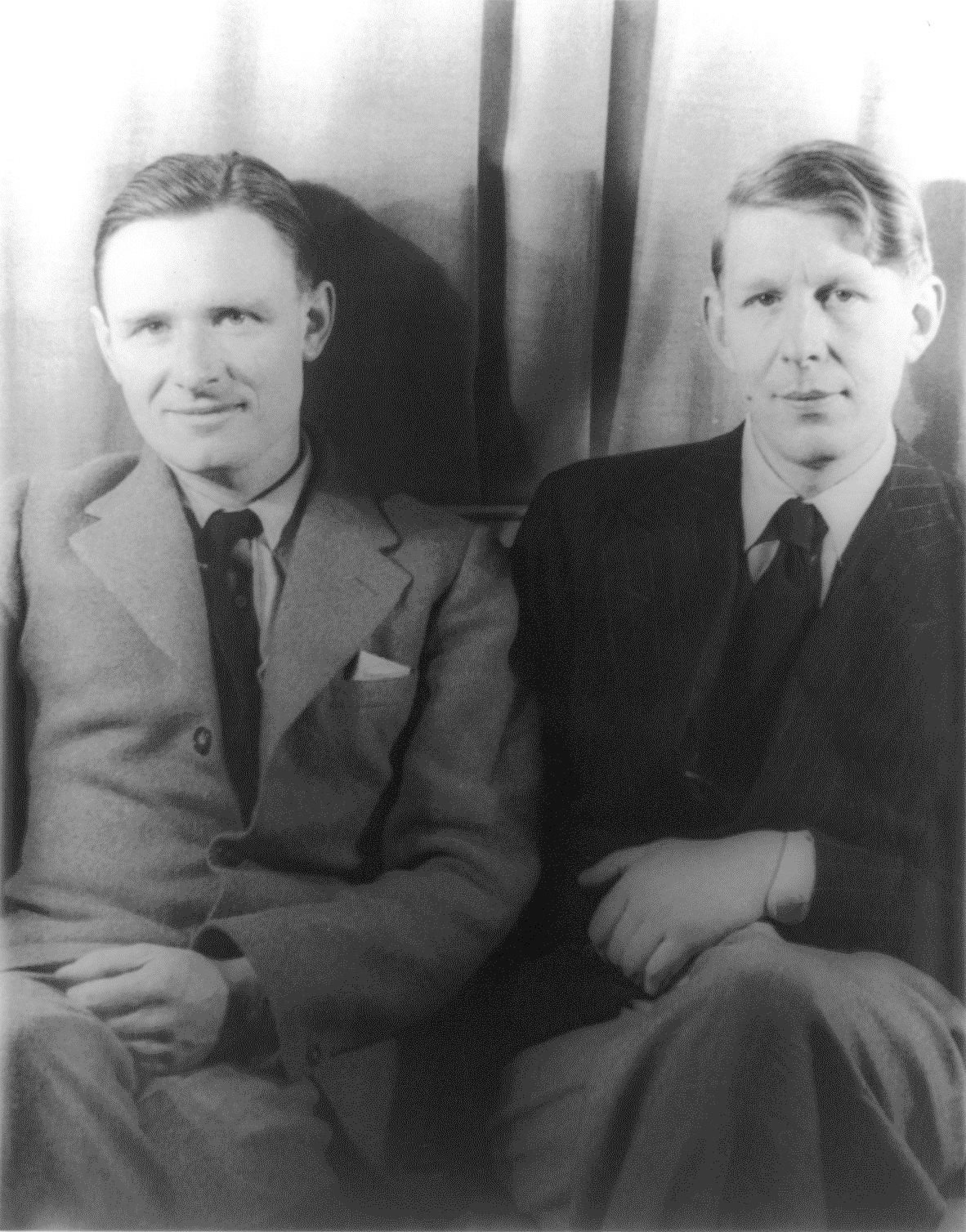
Isherwood in 1939

=== Sojourn in Berlin ===
The autobiographical novel recounts writer Christopher Isherwood's sojourn in Jazz Age Berlin and describes the pre-Nazi social milieu as well as the colourful personalities he encountered. At the time, acquaintances described a young Isherwood as indifferent to the growing spectre of fascism, and he had moved to Berlin in order to avail himself of boy prostitutes and to enjoy the city's orgiastic Jazz Age cabarets.

While residing in the city, Isherwood socialised with a blithe circle of expatriates that included W. H. Auden, Stephen Spender, Edward Upward, and Paul Bowles. (Note: Paul Bowles was an American writer who wrote the novel The Sheltering Sky. Isherwood appropriated his surname for the character of Sally Bowles.) As a gay man, he also interacted with marginalised enclaves of Berliners and foreigners who would be at greatest risk from Nazi persecution.

Isherwood based the novel's most memorable character—the "divinely decadent" Sally Bowles—on 19-year-old flapper Jean Ross with whom he shared lodgings at Nollendorfstraße 17 in Schöneberg. Much like the character in the novel, Ross was a sexually liberated young woman and a bohemian chanteuse in lesbian bars and second-rate cabarets.

Isherwood visited these dingy nightclubs to hear Ross sing and described her singing ability as mediocre. "She had a surprisingly deep, husky voice. She sang badly, (Note: Peter Parker notes that Ross "claimed that Isherwood 'grossly underrated' her singing abilities, but her family agreed that this was one aspect of Sally Bowles that Isherwood got absolutely right".) without any expression, her hands hanging down at her sides," Isherwood recalled. "Yet her performance was, in its own way, effective because of her startling appearance and her air of not caring a curse of what people thought of her." Stephen Spender likewise described Ross' singing as underwhelming and forgettable: "In my mind's eye, I can see her now in some dingy bar standing on a platform and singing so inaudibly that I could not hear her from the back of the room where I was discreetly seated."

=== Ross' abortion ===
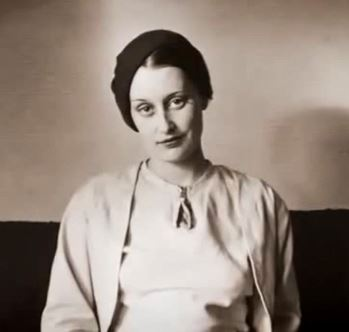
Jean Ross inspired the character of Sally Bowles.

Although Isherwood occasionally had sex with women, Ross—unlike the fictional character Sally Bowles—never tried to seduce Isherwood, although they did share a bed whenever their tiny flat became overcrowded with visiting revelers. Instead, a 27-year-old Isherwood settled into a same-sex relationship with a 16-year-old German boy named Heinz Neddermeyer, while Ross entered into a variety of heterosexual liaisons, including one with the blond musician Peter van Eyck, the future star of Henri-Georges Clouzot's The Wages of Fear.

After her separation from van Eyck, Ross realised she was pregnant. As a favour to Ross, Isherwood facilitated an abortion procedure. Ross nearly died as a result of the botched abortion. Following her abortion, Isherwood visited Ross in the hospital. Wrongly assuming he was the father, the hospital staff despised him for impregnating Ross and then callously forcing her to have an abortion. These tragicomic events inspired Isherwood to write his 1937 novella Sally Bowles and serves as its narrative climax.

While Ross recovered from the abortion, the political situation rapidly deteriorated in Germany. As Berlin's daily scenes featured "poverty, unemployment, political demonstrations and street fighting between the forces of the extreme left and the extreme right," Isherwood, Ross, Spender, and other British nationals realised that staying in Germany would be perilous. "There was a sensation of doom to be felt in the Berlin streets," Spender recalled. Isherwood commented to a friend: "Adolf, with his rectangular black moustache, has come to stay and brought all his friends.... Nazis are to be enrolled as 'auxiliary police,' which means that one must now not only be murdered but that it is illegal to offer any resistance."

Two weeks after the Enabling Act cemented Adolf Hitler's power, Isherwood fled Germany and returned to England on 5 April 1933. Afterwards, most of Berlin's seedy cabarets were shuttered by the Nazis, and many of Isherwood's cabaret friends fled abroad or perished in concentration camps. These events became the genesis of Isherwood's Berlin tales.

=== Later events ===
After leaving Germany, Ross became a devout Stalinist and a lifelong member of Harry Pollitt's Communist Party of Great Britain. She served as a war correspondent for the Daily Express during the subsequent Spanish Civil War (1936–39), and she is alleged to have been a propagandist for Joseph Stalin's Comintern. A skilled writer, Ross also worked as a film critic for the Daily Worker, (Note: Ross wrote many articles using the alias Peter Porcupine.) and her criticisms of early Soviet cinema were described by critics as ingenious works of "dialectical sophistry". She often wrote political criticism, anti-fascist polemics, and manifestos. For the remainder of her life, Ross believed the public association of herself with the naïve and apolitical character of Sally Bowles occluded her lifelong work as a professional writer and political activist.

[Jean Ross] never liked Goodbye to Berlin, nor felt any sense of identity with the character of Sally Bowles ... She never cared enough, however, to be moved to any public rebuttal. She did from time to time settle down conscientiously to write a letter, intending to explain to Isherwood the ways in which she thought he had misunderstood her; but it seldom progressed beyond 'Dear Christopher ...' It was interrupted, no doubt, by more urgent things: meetings about Vietnam, petitions against nuclear weapons, making my supper, hearing my French verbs. It was in Isherwood's life, not hers, that Sally Bowles remained a significant figure.

— Sarah Caudwell, Ross' daughter, "Reply to Berlin", October 1986

Ross particularly resented how Isherwood depicted Sally Bowles expressing antisemitism. In the 1937 novella Sally Bowles, the character laments having sex with an "awful old Jew" to obtain money. Ross' daughter, Sarah Caudwell, said such racial bigotry "would have been as alien to my mother's vocabulary as a sentence in Swahili; she had no more deeply rooted passion than a loathing of racialism and so, from the outset, of fascism."

Due to her unyielding dislike of fascism, Ross disliked that Isherwood depicted her as allied in her beliefs "with the attitudes which led to Dachau and Auschwitz". In the early 21st century, some writers have argued the antisemitic remarks in "Sally Bowles" are a reflection of Isherwood's own much-documented racial prejudices. (Note: In an article for The New York Review of Books, writer Gore Vidal notes Isherwood's inordinate preoccupation with racial matters. In contrast to Isherwood, Ross was noted in her later years for her commitment to racial equality.) According to biographer Peter Parker, Isherwood was "fairly anti-Semitic to a degree that required some emendations of the Berlin novels when they were republished after the war".

Although Isherwood's stories about the Jazz Age nightlife of Weimar-era Berlin became commercially successful, Isherwood later denounced his writings. He lamented that he had not understood the suffering of the people which he depicted. He stated that 1930s Berlin had been:

a real city in which human beings were suffering the miseries of political violence and near-starvation. The 'wickedness' of Berlin's night-life was of the most pitiful kind; the kisses and embraces, as always, had price-tags attached to them.... As for the 'monsters', they were quite ordinary human beings prosaically engaged in getting their living through illegal methods. The only genuine monster was the young foreigner who passed gaily through these scenes of desolation, misinterpreting them to suit his childish fantasy.

== Critical reception ==
Goodbye to Berlin received positive reviews by newspaper critics and contemporary writers. Critics praised Isherwood's "flair for sheer story-telling" and his ability to spin "an engrossing tale without bothering you with a plot." In a review for The Observer, novelist L. P. Hartley wrote that Isherwood "is an artist to his finger-tips. If he were not, these sketches of pre-Hitlerian Berlin (the Nazi regime is coming into force when the book closes) would make still sadder reading, for all around is poverty, suspicion, and the threat of violence." Hartley concluded by noting that "if his glimpses are oblique and partial, they are also revealing: Goodbye to Berlin is a historical as well as a personal record."

Critic Anne Margaret Angus praised Isherwood's mastery in conveying the ingravescent despair of Berlin's denizens, "with their febrile emotionalism" and "their hopeless clinging to the pleasures of the moment". She believed Isherwood skillfully evoked "the psychological and emotional hotbed which forced the growth of that incredible tree, 'national socialism'." She concluded by noting that "suffering sometimes from too great restraint, his studies, when they do succeed, surely (and often painfully) enlarge our knowledge of human nature."

Contemporary writer and literary critic George Orwell likewise praised the novel. Although Orwell believed the work to be inferior to Isherwood's earlier novel, Mr Norris Changes Trains, he nonetheless believed that Goodbye to Berlin contained "brilliant sketches of a society in decay". In particular, Orwell singled out for praise the chapter titled "The Nowaks" which concerns a working-class Berlin family on the verge of destitution and disaster. "Reading such tales as this," Orwell observed, "the thing that surprises one is not that Hitler came to power, but that he did not do so several years earlier. The book ends with the triumph of the Nazis and Mr. Isherwood's departure from Berlin."

== Critical analysis ==
In her 2012 book Anti-Nazi Modernism: The Challenges of Resistance in 1930s Fiction, author Mia Spiro remarks that "despite that which they could not know, the novels that Barnes, Isherwood, and Woolf wrote do reveal the historical, cultural, political, and social conditions in 1930s Europe that made the continent ripe for disaster".

One critic comments on Isherwood's narrative, likening him to a chameleon and she states that, "He was both the self effacating narrator viewing history with the purported objectivity of a camera eye and a fictional character leading a picaresque existence."

== Adaptations ==
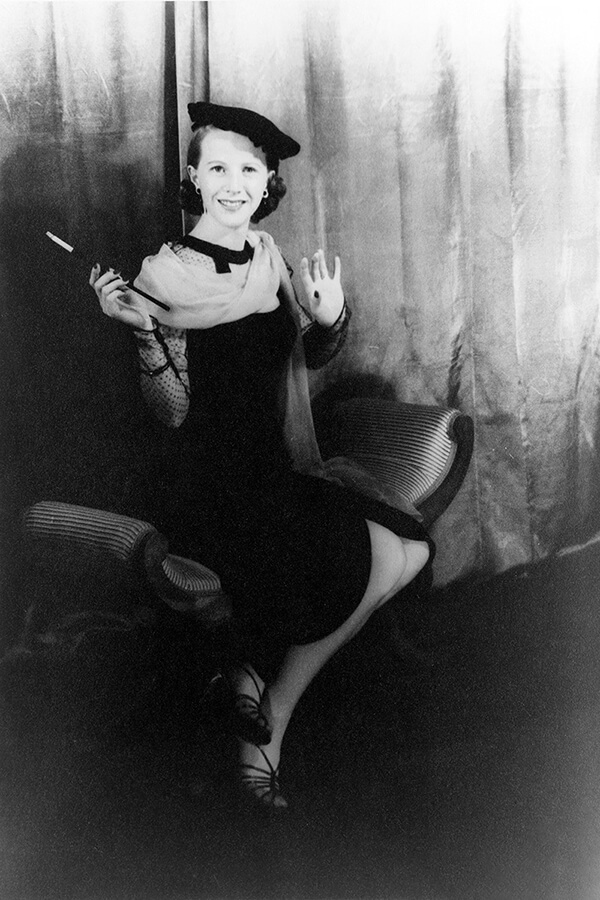
Julie Harris as the insouciant Sally Bowles

John Van Druten adapted the novel into a 1951 Broadway play called I Am a Camera. The play was a personal success for Julie Harris as the insouciant Sally Bowles, earning her her first of five Tony Awards for Best Leading Actress. It earned a largely favorable review from critic Walter Kerr, but was the subject of an often misattributed joke review by Goodman Ace of, "No Leica." The play's title is a quote taken from the novel's first page ("I am a camera with its shutter open, quite passive, recording, not thinking."). The play was then adapted into a commercially successful 1955 film, also called I Am a Camera, featuring Laurence Harvey, Shelley Winters and Julie Harris, with screenplay by John Collier and music by Malcolm Arnold.

The book was next adapted into the Tony Award-winning 1966 musical Cabaret and the 1972 film Cabaret for which Liza Minnelli won an Academy Award for playing Sally. Isherwood was highly critical of the 1972 film due to what he perceived as its negative portrayal of homosexuality. He noted that, "in the film of Cabaret, the male lead is called Brian Roberts. He is a bisexual Englishman; he has an affair with Sally and, later, with one of Sally's lovers, a German baron... Brian's homosexual tendency is treated as an indecent but comic weakness to be snickered at, like bed-wetting."

Isherwood's friends, especially the poet Stephen Spender, often lamented how the cinematic and stage adaptations of Goodbye to Berlin glossed over Weimar-era Berlin's crushing poverty: "There is not a single meal, or club, in the movie Cabaret, that Christopher and I could have afforded [in 1931]." Spender, Isherwood, W. H. Auden and others asserted that both the 1972 film and 1966 Broadway musical deleteriously glamorised the harsh realities of the 1930s Weimar era.

== Influence ==
According to literary critics, the character of Sally Bowles in Goodbye to Berlin inspired Truman Capote's Holly Golightly in his novella Breakfast at Tiffany's. Critics have alleged that both scenes and dialogue in Capote's 1958 novella have direct equivalencies in Isherwood's earlier 1937 work. Capote had befriended Isherwood in New York in the late 1940s, and Capote was an admirer of Isherwood's novels.

== Censorship ==
In April 2025, the Lukashenko regime of Belarus added the book to a list of printed publications containing information messages and materials deemed harmful to national interests.
