= David March (actor) =

English actor (1925–1999)

David March (18 February 1925, Leamington Spa, Warwickshire – 25 August 1999, London) was an English actor who had a prominent career on British radio from 1953 until his death 45 years later. He also appeared on London's West End and other major British theaters during the mid 20th century, but eschewed theatre for radio and television after 1964. In 1985, he received the Radio Academy Award for Best Radio Actor for his performance in a dramatisation of Mr Norris Changes Trains. He also periodically appeared In British television, beginning with several filmed productions of William Shakespeare's plays for television during the 1940s. His television credits include appearances on Doctor Who, The Benny Hill Show, The Morecambe & Wise Show, The Power Game.The First Churchills, The Basil Brush Show and The Onedin Line among others.

== Life and career ==
Born in Leamington Spa, March was trained at the Royal Academy of Dramatic Art during World War II. He began his career in Scotland as a repertory actor at the Byre Theatre in St Andrews and at the Perth Theatre. He then joined the roster of artists at the Stratford Memorial Theatre (now called Royal Shakespeare Theatre) at the invitation of director Robert Atkins; appearing mainly in small to mid sized roles like the Eunuch in Antony and Cleopatra and Rodrigo in Othello. In 1944, he performed at the Stratford Festival as Sir John Bushy and Sir Pierce of Exton in Richard II. In 1946 and 1947, he was committed to the theatrical seasons at Regent's Park Open Air Theatre where he portrayed Patroclus in Troilus and Cressida and the roles of Philostrate and Francis Flute in A Midsummer Night's Dream.

In 1950, March became a member of the Oxford Playhouse. There he had a triumphant success as the central clown character "He" in Leonid Andreyev's He Who Gets Slapped in 1952. Directed by Oliver Marlow Wilkinson, that lauded production also starred Susan Dowdall as Consuelo, John McKelvey as Briquet, Hugh Manning as Count Mancini, Mary Savidge as Zinida, and Ronnie Barker as Polly. Other roles he excelled in at the Oxford Playhouse included Friar Laurence in Romeo and Juliet, Rupert Cadell in Rope, and Roland Maule in Present Laughter among others. In 1959, he portrayed the title role in Henri Ghéon's The Marriage of Saint Francis at the Maddermarket Theatre. The same year, he starred in James Roose-Evans's Stories and Designs at the Hampstead Theatre; a one-man show written for March based on the writings of Virginia Woolf. At Hampstead, he also appeared as Tiresias in Oedipus Rex and in Marguerite Duras's The Square (1964).

In April 1954, March portrayed John de Stogumber in Esme Percy's staging of George Bernard Shaw's Saint Joan with at the Q Theatre with Rachel Kempson as the title heroine; a role which he repeated at the Cambridge Drama Festival in 1956 with Siobhan McKenna as Joan. His work in that play drew the attention of radio producer R. D. Smith, and led to his first job performing on radio in 1953. From 1965 on, March only performed in radio and television, and never returned to stage performance. His radio career was ubiquitous and spanned a 45-year period in which he excelled in radio dramas. One of the programmes he was associated with was the role of Richard Fulton in Mrs Dale's Diary (1954–1969).

His life partner was Derek Lewis.
