= Christopher and His Kind (film) =

2011 BBC television film

- Region 2 DVD cover
- Based on: Christopher and His Kind by Christopher Isherwood
- Written by: Kevin Elyot
- Directed by: Geoffrey Sax
- Starring: Matt Smith; Douglas Booth; Imogen Poots; Pip Carter; Toby Jones; Alexander Dreymon
- Music by: Dominik Scherrer
- Country of origin: United Kingdom
- Original language: English

Production
- Producer: Celia Duval
- Cinematography: Kieran McGuigan
- Editor: Paul Knight
- Running time: 90 minutes
- Production company: Mammoth Screen

Original release
- Network: Arte
- Release: 20 February 2011
- Network: BBC Two; BBC HD
- Release: 19 March 2011

Christopher and His Kind is a 2011 BBC television film. It tells the story of Christopher Isherwood's exploits in Berlin in the early 1930s. The film, adapted by Kevin Elyot from Isherwood's autobiography Christopher and His Kind, was produced by Mammoth Screen and directed by Geoffrey Sax. Isherwood is played by Matt Smith, whilst the cast also includes Douglas Booth, Imogen Poots, Pip Carter, Toby Jones, and Alexander Dreymon.

== Plot ==
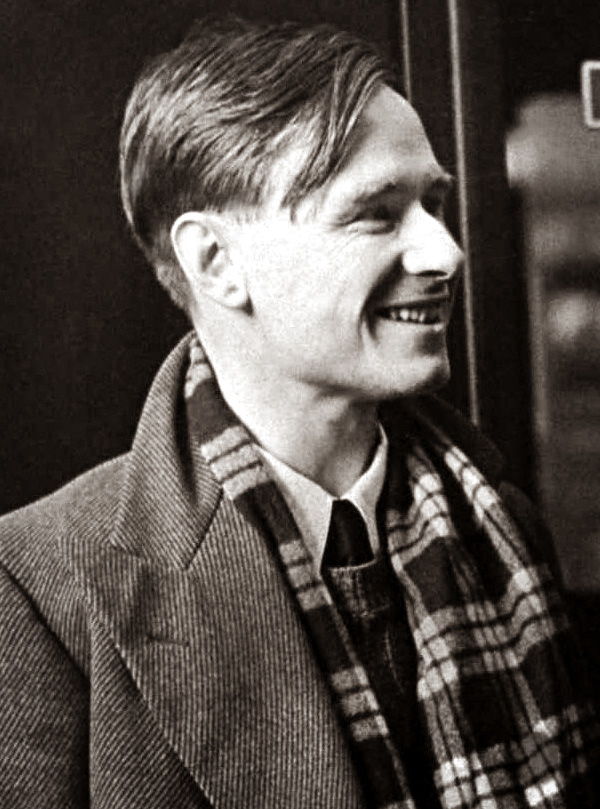
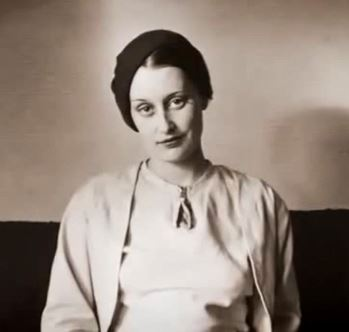
Writer Christopher Isherwood (left) and Jean Ross (right) photographed in the 1930s.

In Los Angeles in 1976, Christopher Isherwood begins writing his memoir. The film flashes back to 1931 as Christopher prepares to leave England for Germany, against the wishes of his mother, Kathleen. On the train he meets Gerald Hamilton, an English ne'er-do-well of Irish descent, who suggests that Christopher take a room at the boarding house where he lives. Upon his arrival in Berlin, Christopher meets his friend Wystan Auden, who takes him to the Cosy Corner, a seedy gay club populated by hustlers.

Christopher takes up residence at Gerald's boarding house under landlady Fräulein Thurau. He becomes fast friends with Jean Ross, an aspiring actress who sings at an underground club. He also begins a tumultuous affair with Caspar, one of the rentboys from the Cosy Corner. Their relationship continues until Caspar abruptly disappears. Christopher does not see him until many months later and is horrified to see that he has joined the Nazis.

To earn a living Christopher offers English lessons. One of his students is Wilfrid Landauer (based on the true person of Wilfrid Israel), the wealthy Jewish owner of a department store. He entreats Christopher to take a political stand against Nazism but Christopher, as an artist, initially demurs. Herr Landauer's home is ransacked by the Nazis and they lead a boycott against his and other Jewish-owned businesses. Christopher last sees Wilfrid when their eyes sorrowfully meet over a bonfire of books the Nazis are burning.

Heinz Neddermayer, a street sweeper whom Christopher spies from a café, enters Christopher's life and they fall in love. Frau Neddermeyer looks kindly upon Christopher but Heinz's brother Gerhardt, a Nazi sympathizer, detests him. When Frau Neddermayer enters a sanatorium for treatment of tuberculosis, Gerhardt angrily advises Heinz that Christopher and Jean are no longer welcome in his home.

Bobby Gilbert, an American steel heir whom Jean had been courting to take her to Hollywood, departs Berlin suddenly, leaving Jean bereft and pregnant. She pawns her jewelry to pay for an abortion and soon after leaves Berlin as well.

With the Nazis gaining power, Christopher and Heinz decide to leave Berlin. They travel to England where Christopher tries to secure permanent residency for Heinz. Their hopes are dashed, however, when a passport officer denies Heinz a permit to remain in the country. The couple decide to travel around Europe, avoiding a return to Nazi Germany.

Several years later Jean and Christopher chance upon each other in an outdoor café in England. They reminisce and he tells her that Heinz was eventually arrested and sentenced to prison, followed by a stint in the army. Jean confides that she does not miss Berlin.

The scene shifts to 1952. Christopher has returned to Berlin for the first time since 1934, to write a magazine article. He reunites with Heinz who, following the partition of the city, ended up in East Berlin. He has married and has a son named Christoph. Heinz expresses his wish that Christopher should find a family of his own and suggests that he and his family could move to America and become Christopher's family as well. Christopher refuses to commit to the idea but promises to remain in contact with Heinz. He visits his old boarding house for a joyful reunion with Fräulein Thurau, whose home ended up being in the American sector of the city. She presents him with the dolphin clock that adorned his old room, exhorting him to look at it and remember happy times.

Closing titles convey that the next year, 1953, Christopher met Don Bachardy and remained together until Isherwood's death. Christopher and His Kind was published in 1976 and Heinz, shocked at its frankness, never communicated with Christopher again.

== Cast ==
- Matt Smith as Christopher Isherwood
- Douglas Booth as Heinz Neddermeyer
- Imogen Poots as Jean Ross
- Pip Carter as W. H. Auden
- Toby Jones as Gerald Hamilton
- Alexander Dreymon as Caspar
- Tom Wlaschiha as Gerhardt Neddermeyer
- Issy Van Randwyck as Fräulein Thurau
- Gertrude Thoma as Lili Neddermayer
- Lindsay Duncan as Kathleen Isherwood
- Perry Millward as Richard Isherwood
- Iddo Goldberg as Wilfrid Landauer
- Will Kemp as Bobby Gilbert
- Stuart Graham as Passport officer

== Production ==
Christopher and His Kind was shot in Belfast, Northern Ireland. To research the role, Matt Smith read Isherwood's novels, watched video footage of Isherwood and traveled to the United States to meet Isherwood's longtime companion, Don Bachardy. "Just seeing the love Don had for him, and to be in the space where Christopher had lived and written was very informative."

For her portrayal of aspiring chanteuse Jean Ross, actress Imogen Poots claimed that she attempted to show Ross' personality as "convincingly fragile beneath layers of attitude." However, Poots did not wish to depict Ross as a talented singer. Poots explained that—in her estimation—if "Jean had been that good, she wouldn't have been wasting her time hanging around with Isherwood in the cabarets of the Weimar Republic, she would have been on her way, perhaps, to the life she dreamed of in Hollywood." Filming began on 16 May 2010 and ended on 8 June 2010.

== Critical reception ==
Sam Wollaston of The Guardian strongly praised Christopher and His Kind, citing an excellent performance from Smith, whom he calls "appealingly rakish, thoroughly disreputable, charming, posh, clever and funny" and compares favorably to John Hurt's performances as Quentin Crisp. He similarly praised several of the other performers and applauded the film for its masterful evocation of its time period, concluding, "Brilliant, top drama, well done." Michael Hogan for The Sunday Telegraph concurred in this assessment, calling the film "handsomely shot, lovingly recreating the period, but with a twinkling, tongue-in-cheek feel – not to mention some lusty sex scenes – that stops it becoming too misty-eyed". He echoed the kudos for the performances from Smith and the supporting cast.

Less impressed was John Lloyd for the Financial Times who found the gay sex scenes discomfiting. Additionally, he thought that the acting was not intense enough, finding the scenes between Christopher and his mother to be the most effective. The film, he concluded, "wasn't great but it was bravely done, all the same".
