= Gerald Hamilton =

British writer (1890–1970)

- Born: Gerald Bernard Francis Souter; 1 November 1890; Shanghai, China
- Died: 9 June 1970 (aged 79); London, England
- Education: Rugby School
- Occupation: Writer
- Writing career
- Subjects: Memoir

Gerald Bernard Francis Hamilton (né Souter; 1 November 1890 – 9 June 1970) was a British memoirist, critic and internationalist known as "the wickedest man in Europe". Hamilton counted among his friends Winston Churchill, Robin Maugham, Tallulah Bankhead and Christopher Isherwood, who wrote of Hamilton's remarkable personality and frequently shady dealings in his literary memoir Christopher and His Kind.

== Early life ==
Born Gerald Frank Hamilton Souter in Shanghai on 1 November 1890, he was educated at Lambrook preparatory and Rugby School in England. Hamilton's father, Frank Thomas Edward Souter (1863–1941), was a businessman of Scottish descent with commercial interests in China, and his mother, Edith Minnie, née Holliday (1860–1890), was English. During two years working in China, Souter fell ill with dysentery and was cared for by a Catholic nurse, which he said inspired him to convert to Catholicism. His conversion caused his father to disown him; as a result, he changed his surname from Souter to Hamilton. He hinted that his lineage was "faintly ducal", but it is unknown if he was directly related to anyone with a title. According to Anthony Powell, all that had to be done to disprove that claim was to look up his named father and grandfather, who were not to be found in any title registry.

== World Wars ==
Hamilton was interned in the United Kingdom during the First World War because, he claimed, of his association with Roger Casement, the Irish nationalist later executed for treason. Hamilton's own homosexuality was only a thinly veiled secret. Winston Churchill had the Communist-sympathising Hamilton temporarily interned during the Second World War because of his vocal opposition to the conflict.

== Sales representative, informer, and prisoner ==
Hamilton was employed at various times by The Times as its German sales representative. He was known as a fixer for Willi Münzenberg, "the notorious communist, who presided in Berlin on behalf of Moscow over the doings of the League Against Imperialism and Friends of Soviet Russia" (as British Intelligence described him), and as a go-between or informer by various agencies, including Sinn Féin, Special Branch, and the British Military Mission in Berlin. At one time, he shared accommodation with "the Great Beast", Aleister Crowley. Hamilton served prison sentences for bankruptcy, theft, gross indecency and being a threat to national security.

== Memoirs ==
Hamilton served as the model for Isherwood's character Arthur Norris in his novel Mr Norris Changes Trains (1935) (published in the U.S. as The Last of Mr Norris). Hamilton derived from this the title for his own memoir Mr Norris and I (published in 1956). An earlier memoir by Hamilton, As Young as Sophocles, was published in 1937, and a third memoir, The Way It Was with Me was published in 1969, all three books giving wholly different versions of even the most basic biographical information. Other accounts of Hamilton's life provide further obfuscation; Robin Maugham's five-part "exposé" in The People was in fact concocted in collusion with Hamilton, while John Symonds's Conversations with Gerald (1974) allowed Hamilton to spin yet more yarns.

== Life in Berkshire ==
In 1940, Hamilton became the lover of jazz bandleader Ken "Snakehips" Johnson, who was 20 years his junior. They moved in together at 91 Kinnerton Street in Belgravia and later bought a cottage called "Little Basing" in Vicarage Road, Bray, Berkshire, where Johnson could go sailing, which was one of his hobbies.

Hamilton was at that cottage when he received a phone call on 9 March 1941, informing him of Johnson's death in a bombing raid, and asking him to come and identify the body. He later recalled: "Again that awful feeling of nausea which I had felt when France fell, and again that sensation of the ground slipping from beneath my feet." From then on, Hamilton kept a picture of Johnson in a white tuxedo with white satin facings at all times with him, calling him "my husband".

== Marriages of convenience ==
In addition, he had a picture of "My wife", Suzanne "Suzy" Renou, a close friend whom he had wed in a marriage of convenience at Chelsea Register Office on 29 April 1933 for a payment of £20,000. Renou was the daughter of Alphonse Renou, a company director. Hamilton had previously been married and divorced from Diana Parker, daughter of Captain Alfred Parker. This was also a paid marriage of convenience, and took place on 31 August 1929 at St Jude's Church, Kensington.

== Far-right supporter ==
In the post-war period, Hamilton drifted towards the far-right: he was active on behalf of Oswald Mosley, and in 1948 travelled to the United States, with the intention of procuring a loan for the Franco government from the Knights of Columbus. In 1959, Hamilton accepted South African money to write a travel book, Jacaranda, which is said to have portrayed apartheid in a favourable light.

== Historical works ==
His other books include Emma in Blue, about Lady Emma Hamilton and particularly her friendship with Maria Carolina of Austria while in Naples, and Blood Royal, a history of Queen Victoria's immediate descendants and relatives in Europe, and the haemophilia that afflicted the family.

== Old age ==
Hamilton's latter days saw him living in a bedsitter at 518A King's Road, London, above a Chinese restaurant called The Good Earth. Of this, he liked to say: "Better above the Good Earth than below it."

== Death ==
Hamilton died on 9 June 1970, aged 79, in St Stephen's Hospital in Chelsea, as a result of heart failure. He was cremated.

== In popular culture ==
Later in his life, Hamilton became friends with John Symonds, author and editor, who wrote Conversations with Gerald about their acquaintance. There is a classic account of Hamilton in later life in Robin Maugham's second volume of autobiography, Search for Nirvana (1979). Hamilton was portrayed by Toby Jones in the BBC production Christopher and His Kind (2011).

== Works ==
- As Young as Sophocles, Secker & Warburg, 1937
- Mr Norris and I, Allan Wingate, 1956
- Emma in Blue, Allan Wingate, 1957
- Jacaranda, Sidgwick & Jackson, London, 1961
- Blood Royal, Times Publishing/Anthony Gibbs & Phillips, 1964
- The Way it Was With Me, London: Leslie Frewin, 1969, ISBN 0-09-096560-4
