= I Am a Camera =

1951 Broadway play by John Van Druten

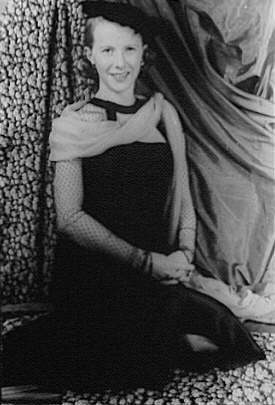
- Julie Harris as Sally Bowles; Photograph by Carl Van Vechten, May 1952
- Written by: John Van Druten
- Based on: Berlin Stories by Christopher Isherwood
- Characters: Christopher Isherwood; Fraulein Schneider; Fritz Wendel; Sally Bowles; Natalia Landauer; Clive Mortimer; Mrs. Watson-Courtneidge
- Subject: An English writer living in Berlin before the rise of the Hitler regime
- Genre: Drama
- Setting: A room in Fraulein Schneider's flat in Berlin 1930

Premiere
- Date: November 28, 1951
- Place: Empire Theatre, New York City

I Am a Camera is a 1951 Broadway play by John Van Druten adapted from Christopher Isherwood's 1939 novel Goodbye to Berlin, which is part of The Berlin Stories.

The title is a quotation taken from the novel's first page: "I am a camera with its shutter open, quite passive, recording, not thinking." The original production was staged by John Van Druten, with scenic and lighting design by Boris Aronson and costumes by Ellen Goldsborough. It opened at the Empire Theatre in New York City on November 28, 1951, and ran for 214 performances before closing on July 12, 1952.

The production was a critically acclaimed success for both Julie Harris as the insouciant Sally Bowles, winning her the first of five Tony Awards of her career for Best Leading Actress in a play, and for Marian Winters, who won both the Theatre World Award and Tony Award for Featured Actress in a Play. The play also won for John Van Druten the New York Drama Critics' Circle for Best American Play (1952). The gossip columnist Walter Winchell reported that humorist Goodman Ace gave an extremely short review of, "No Leica," to the play. This has later been attributed to Walter Kerr.

== Original Broadway Cast (1951) ==
- Christopher Isherwood – William Prince
- Fraulein Schneider – Olga Fabian
- Fritz Wendel – Martin Brooks
- Sally Bowles – Julie Harris
- Natalia Landauer – Marian Winters
- Clive Mortimer – Edward Andrews
- Mrs. Watson-Courtneidge – Catherine Willard

== Adaptations ==
- Film – I Am a Camera (1955) – screenplay by John Collier, music by Malcolm Arnold, starring Julie Harris, Laurence Harvey, and Shelley Winters.
- Broadway Musical – Cabaret (1966) – directed by Hal Prince, book by Joe Masteroff, music by John Kander, lyrics by Fred Ebb, starring Jill Haworth, Bert Convy, Lotte Lenya, Jack Gilford, and Joel Grey.
- Film Musical – Cabaret (1972) – directed by Bob Fosse, music by John Kander, lyrics by Fred Ebb, starring Liza Minnelli, Joel Grey, and Michael York.

== Awards and nominations ==
=== Original Broadway production ===
Year	Award	Category	Nominee	Result
1952	Tony Award	Best Actress in a Play	Julie Harris	Won
1952	Tony Award	Best Featured Actress in a Play	Marian Winters	Won
1952	Theatre World Award		Marian Winters	Won
