= Auden Group =

Group of British and Irish writers

The Auden Group, also called Auden Generation and sometimes simply the Thirties poets, was a group of British and Irish writers active in the 1930s that included W. H. Auden, Louis MacNeice, Cecil Day-Lewis, Stephen Spender, Christopher Isherwood and sometimes Edward Upward and Rex Warner.

== Overview ==
Although many newspaper articles and a few books appeared about the "Auden Group", the existence of the group was essentially a journalistic myth, a convenient label for poets and novelists who were approximately the same age, who had been educated at Oxford and Cambridge, who had known each other at different times and had more or less left-wing views ranging from MacNeice's political scepticism to Upward's committed communism.

The "group" was rarely together in the same room: the four poets Auden, Day-Lewis, MacNeice and Spender were in the same room only once in the 1930s, for a BBC broadcast in 1938 of modern poets (also including Dylan Thomas and others who were not associated with the "Auden Group"). The event was so insignificant that Day-Lewis failed to mention it when he wrote in his autobiography, The Buried Day, that the four were first together in 1953.

The connections between individual writers as friends and collaborators were, however, real. Auden and Isherwood produced three plays and a travel book. Auden and MacNeice collaborated on a travel book. As undergraduates, Auden and Day-Lewis wrote a brief introduction to the annual Oxford Poetry. Auden dedicated books to Isherwood and Spender. Day-Lewis mentioned Auden in a poem, but the whole group never operated as such.

== Macspaunday ==
"MacSpaunday" was a name invented by Roy Campbell, in his Talking Bronco (1946), to designate a composite figure made up of the four poets:

- Louis MacNeice ("Mac")
- Stephen Spender ("sp")
- W. H. Auden ("au-n")
- Cecil Day-Lewis ("day")

Campbell, in common with much literary journalism of the period, imagined that the four were a group of like-minded poets although they shared little but left-wing views in the broadest sense of the word. Campbell elsewhere implied that the four were homosexual, but MacNeice and Day-Lewis were entirely heterosexual.

In later years, the term was sometimes used neutrally, as a synonym for the "Thirties poets" or "the New Poetry of the 1930s".
