= Cabaret (1972 film) =

1972 American musical film by Bob Fosse

- Theatrical release poster
- Directed by: Bob Fosse
- Screenplay by: Jay Presson Allen (Note: Rewrites by Hugh Wheeler, credited as "research consultant" (see Screenplay revisions).)
- Based on: Cabaret (1966 musical) by Joe Masteroff; I Am a Camera (1951 play) by John Van Druten; Goodbye to Berlin (1939 novel) by Christopher Isherwood
- Produced by: Cy Feuer
- Starring: Liza Minnelli; Michael York; Helmut Griem; Marisa Berenson; Joel Grey
- Cinematography: Geoffrey Unsworth
- Edited by: David Bretherton
- Music by: Score and lyrics: Kander and Ebb; Adaptation: Ralph Burns
- Production company: ABC Pictures Corp.
- Distributed by: Allied Artists
- Release date: February 13, 1972
- Running time: 124 minutes
- Country: United States
- Language: English
- Budget: $4.6 million
- Box office: $42.8 million

Cabaret is a 1972 American musical drama film directed and choreographed by Bob Fosse from a screenplay by Jay Presson Allen. It is based on the 1966 stage musical by Joe Masteroff (book) and the duo Kander and Ebb (music), which in turn was based on the 1951 play I Am a Camera by John Van Druten and the 1939 novel Goodbye to Berlin by Christopher Isherwood. It stars Liza Minnelli, Michael York, Helmut Griem, Marisa Berenson, and Joel Grey. The film won eight Academy Awards, including Best Director for Fosse, Best Actress for Minnelli, and Best Supporting Actor for Grey. Multiple numbers from the stage score were used for the film, which also featured three other songs by Kander and Ebb, including two written for the adaptation.

In the traditional manner of musical theatre, most major characters in the stage version sing to express their emotions and advance the plot; in the film, however, the musical numbers are almost entirely diegetic (recognized by the characters themselves as musical numbers) and take place inside the club, with the exception of "Tomorrow Belongs to Me", which is not performed in the club or by the club characters, but is still diegetic, a nationalistic song sung by a Nazi youth and the German crowd.

Cabaret was released in the United States on February 13, 1972, by Allied Artists. The film received critical acclaim and eventually earned more than $42 million in the box office against a production budget of $4.6 million. At the 45th Academy Awards, the film won in eight categories – including Best Director (Fosse), Best Actress (Minnelli), Best Supporting Actor (Grey), and Best Score – holding the record for most Oscars earned by a film not honoured for Best Picture. In 1995, Cabaret was selected by the Library of Congress for preservation in the United States National Film Registry as being deemed "culturally, historically, or aesthetically significant".

== Plot ==
In 1931 Berlin, a young, openly promiscuous American, Sally Bowles, performs at the Kit Kat Klub. A new British arrival in the city, Brian Roberts, moves into the boarding house where Sally lives. A reserved academic and writer, Brian must give English lessons to earn a living while completing his doctorate. Sally tries to seduce Brian, but he tells her that on three previous occasions he has tried to have sexual relationships with women, all of which failed. They become friends, and Brian witnesses Sally's bohemian life in the last days of the Weimar Republic. When Brian consoles Sally after her father cancels his meeting with her, they become lovers, concluding that his previous failures with women were because they were "the wrong three girls".

Maximilian von Heune, a rich, married playboy and baron, befriends Sally and takes her and Brian to his country estate where they are both spoiled and courted. After Brian and Max witness a Nazi song breaking out in a cafe, with all but one patron joining in, Brian reminds Max that Max once told him the Nazis were harmless. Max drops his pursuit of the pair in haste. During an argument, Sally tells Brian that she has been having sex with Max, and Brian reveals that he has as well. Brian and Sally later reconcile, and Sally reveals that Max left them 300 marks and mockingly compares the sum with what a professional prostitute earns.

Sally learns that she is pregnant but is unsure of the father. Brian offers to marry her and take her back to his university life in Cambridge. At first, they celebrate their resolution to start this new life together, but after a picnic between Sally and Brian, in which Brian acts distant and uninterested, Sally becomes disheartened by the vision of herself as a bored faculty wife washing dirty diapers. Ultimately, she has an abortion, without informing Brian in advance. When he confronts her, she shares her fears, and the two reach an understanding. Brian departs for England, and Sally continues her life in Berlin, embedding herself in the Kit Kat Klub.

Meanwhile, Fritz Wendel, a German Jew passing as a Protestant Christian, is in love with Natalia Landauer, a wealthy German Jewish heiress who holds him in contempt and suspects his motives. Through Brian, Sally advises him to be more aggressive, which eventually enables Fritz to win her love. However, to gain her parents' consent for their marriage, Fritz must reveal his Jewish background, which he does, and the two are married by a rabbi.

The rise of Fascism in Europe is an ever-present undercurrent and is the overarching plot of the film. The progress of the primary characters can be tracked through their changing actions and attitudes towards the rising Nazism in the Weimar Republic. At the beginning of the film, a member of the Nazi Party is expelled from the Kit Kat Klub by the club manager, who suffers a subsequent beating.

The rise of Nazism in the 1930s is also demonstrated towards the end of the film in a rural beer garden scene. There, a blond boy sings to an audience of all ages ("Tomorrow Belongs to Me") about the beauties of nature and youth. It is eventually revealed that the boy is wearing a Hitler Youth uniform. The ballad then transforms into a militant Nazi anthem, and by the song's end, one by one nearly all of the adults and young people rise and join in the singing. "Do you still think you can control them?" Brian then asks Max. After the beer garden scene, Brian gets into a confrontation with a Nazi on a Berlin street, which leads to his receiving a beating.

In the final scene of the film in the Kit Kat Klub, it slowly becomes apparent in the hazy club that audience members wearing NSDAP uniforms are now sitting in the preferred front seats of the club.

== Cast ==
- Liza Minnelli as Sally Bowles
- Michael York as Brian Roberts
- Helmut Griem as Baron Maximilian von Heune
- Joel Grey as the master of ceremonies
- Fritz Wepper as Fritz Wendel
- Marisa Berenson as Natalia Landauer
- Elisabeth Neumann-Viertel as Fräulein Schneider
- Helen Vita as Fräulein Kost
- Sigrid von Richthofen as Fräulein Mayr
- Gerd Vespermann as Bobby
- Ralf Wolter as Herr Ludwig
- Ricky Renée as Elke
- Estrongo Nachama as the cantor
- Kathryn Doby, Inge Jaeger, Angelika Koch, Helen Velkovorska, Gitta Schmidt and Louise Quick as the Kit Kat Klub dancers
- Oliver Collignon as the Hitler Youth singer (uncredited)
  - Mark Lambert as the singing voice of the Hitler Youth singer (uncredited)
- Pierre Franckh as a Nazi (uncredited)

== Historical basis ==
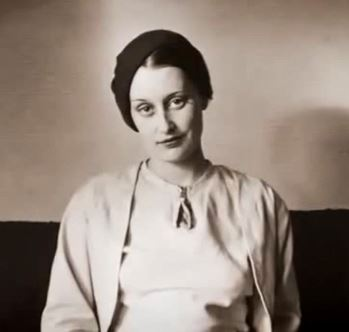
The character of Sally Bowles was based on Jean Ross, a British cabaret singer with whom Isherwood lived as a roommate in Weimar-era Berlin.

The events depicted in the 1972 film are derived from the Anglo-American writer Christopher Isherwood's autobiographical tales of his colourful escapades in the Weimar Republic. In 1929, Isherwood visited his friend W. H. Auden in Weimar-era Berlin during the final year of the Golden Twenties. He soon relocated to Berlin to avail himself of the boy prostitutes found in the city's orgiastic Jazz Age cabarets. His expatriate social circle included Auden, poet Stephen Spender, and 19-year-old British flapper Jean Ross.

By early 1931, Isherwood shared modest lodgings with Ross, a cabaret singer and aspiring film actress. While rooming together in a boarding house in Berlin's Schöneberg quarter, a 27-year-old Isherwood settled into a sexual relationship with a 16-year-old German boy, while Ross engaged in a series of sexual liaisons. After five or six months, the boarding house evicted Ross due to her sexual activities, and she moved in with a heroin addict. During this period, Isherwood and Ross purportedly met John Blomshield, a wealthy playboy who inspired the film character of Baron Maximilian von Heune. Blomshield sexually pursued both Isherwood and Ross. After inviting them on a trip abroad, he disappeared without saying goodbye.

In the summer of 1931, Ross became pregnant by jazz pianist and later actor Peter van Eyck. She underwent a near-fatal abortion facilitated by Isherwood, who pretended to be her impregnator. While Ross recovered from the botched abortion procedure, Germany's political situation deteriorated. As Berlin's daily scenes featured "poverty, unemployment, political demonstrations and street fighting between the forces of the extreme left and the extreme right," Isherwood, Spender, and others realised that they must flee the country. "There was a sensation of doom to be felt in the Berlin streets," Spender recalled.

After the Enabling Act cemented Adolf Hitler's dictatorship, Isherwood fled Nazi Germany in May 1933. Afterwards, the Nazis shuttered most of Berlin's seedy cabarets, and many of Isherwood's acquaintances fled abroad or perished in concentration camps. These factual events inspired Isherwood's Berlin stories, including his 1937 novella Sally Bowles, republished in the 1939 novel Goodbye to Berlin. John Van Druten adapted Goodbye to Berlin into the 1951 play I Am a Camera, and Harold Prince produced it as the 1966 musical Cabaret.

== Production ==
=== Pre-production ===
In July 1968, Cinerama made a verbal agreement to make a film version of the 1966 Broadway musical but pulled out in February 1969. In May 1969, Allied Artists paid a company record $1.5 million for the film rights and planned a company record budget. The cost of $4,570,000 was split evenly with ABC Pictures.

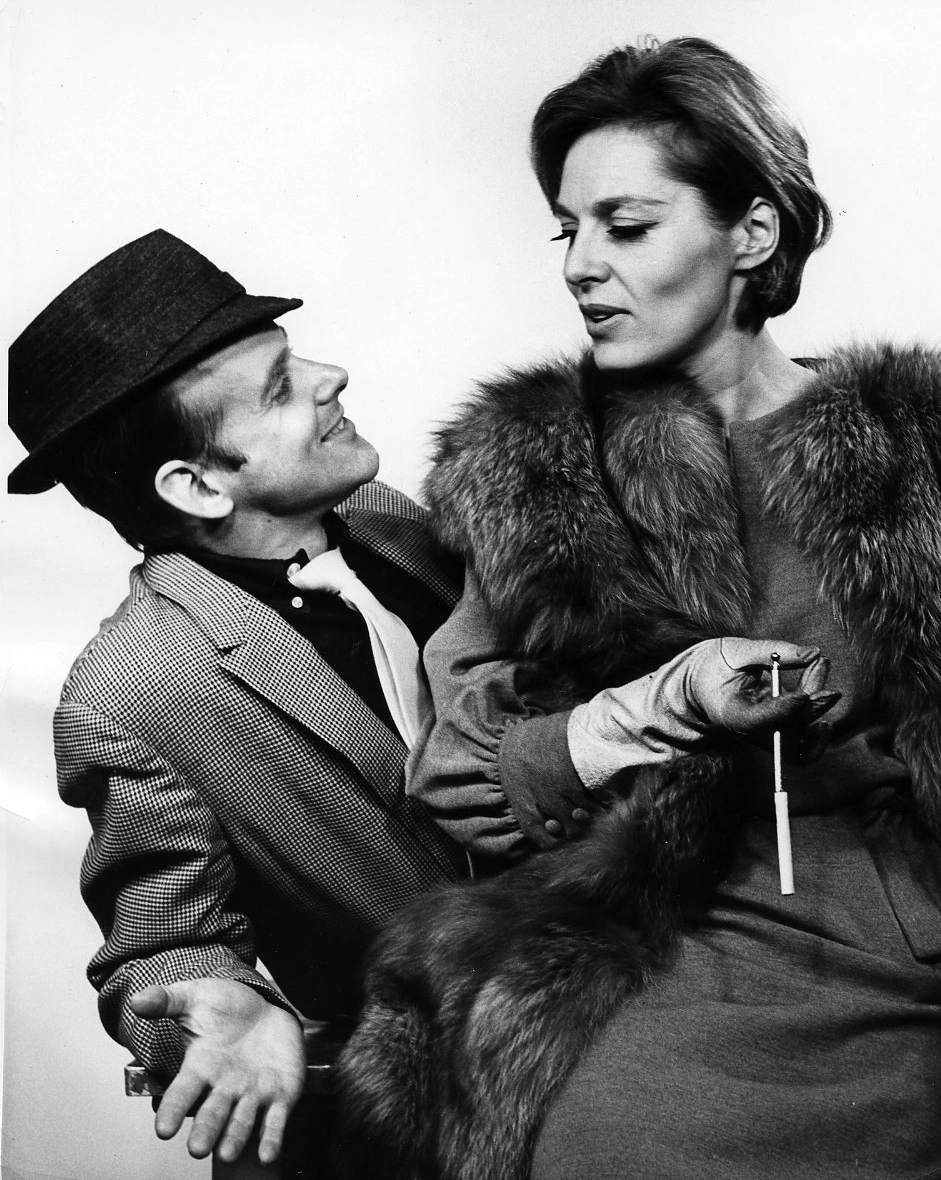
Bob Fosse was eager to direct the film after the box office failure of Sweet Charity (1969).

In 1971, Bob Fosse learned through Harold Prince, director of the original Broadway production, that Cy Feuer was producing a film adaptation of Cabaret through ABC Pictures and Allied Artists. It would be one of the last movies made by ABC. This was the first film produced in the revival of Allied Artists. Determined to direct the film, Fosse begged Feuer to hire him. However, Fosse had previously directed the unsuccessful film adaptation of Sweet Charity, a box office failure which made chief executives Manny Wolf and Marty Baum reluctant to hire him. Wolf and Baum preferred a more renowned or established director such as Billy Wilder, Joseph L. Mankiewicz or Gene Kelly.

Eager to hire Fosse, Feuer appealed to the studio heads, citing Fosse's talent for staging and shooting musical numbers, adding that if inordinate attention was given to filming the book scenes at the expense of the musical numbers, the whole film could fail. Fosse ultimately was hired. Over the next months, Fosse met with previously hired screenwriter Jay Presson Allen to discuss the screenplay.

=== Screenplay revisions ===
As production neared, Fosse became increasingly dissatisfied with Allen's script, which was based on Joe Masteroff's original book of the stage version. Fosse hired Hugh Wheeler to rewrite and revise Allen's work. Wheeler was referred to as a "research consultant," and Allen retained screenwriting credit. Wheeler, a friend of Christopher Isherwood, knew that Isherwood had been critical of the stage musical due to its bowdlerisations of his material. Wheeler went back to Isherwood's original stories in order to ensure a more faithful adaptation of the source material. In particular, Wheeler restored the subplot about the gigolo and the Jewish heiress. Wheeler also drew on gay author Christopher Isherwood's openness about his homosexuality to make the leading male character a bisexual man "rather than the heterosexual as he had been in the stage musical."

Fosse decided to increase the focus on the Kit Kat Klub, where Sally performs, as a metaphor for the decadence of Germany in the 1930s by eliminating all but one of the musical numbers performed outside the club. The only remaining outside number is "Tomorrow Belongs to Me", a folk song rendered spontaneously by patrons at an open-air café. In addition, the show's original songwriters Kander and Ebb wrote two new songs, "Mein Herr" and "Money", and incorporated "Maybe This Time", a song they composed in 1964 and first released by Kaye Ballard.

=== Casting ===
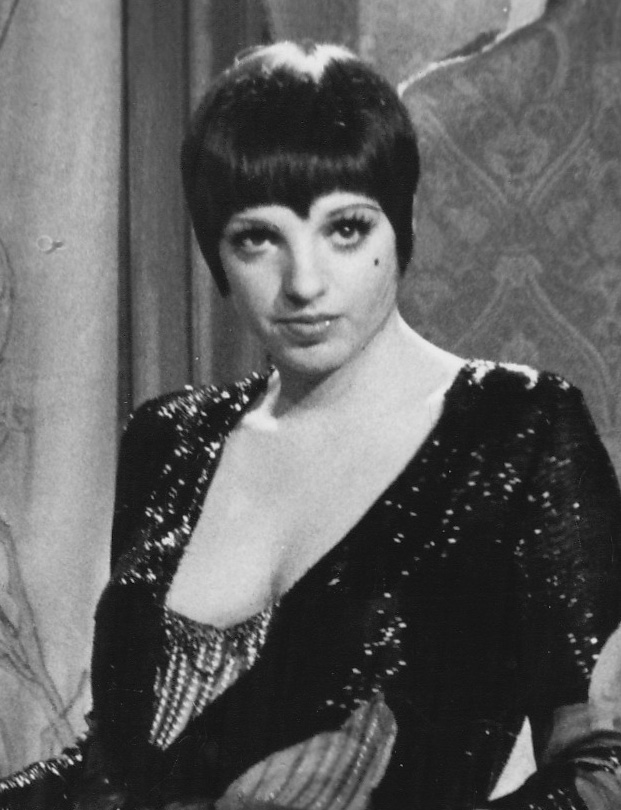
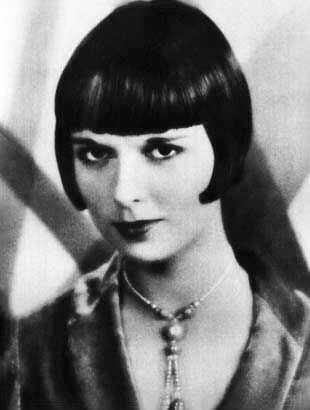
Liza Minnelli as Sally Bowles (left) in the 1972 film. Minnelli modelled the character's appearance upon Louise Brooks (right), an American actress who was famous in 1930s Weimar Germany.

Feuer had cast Liza Minnelli as Sally Bowles and Joel Grey (reprising his stage role) long before Fosse was attached to the project. Fosse was given the choice of using Grey as Master of Ceremonies, at studio insistence, or walking away from the production. He ultimately backed down on his "It's either me or Joel" threat, but relations between them were cool.

Fosse hired Michael York as Sally Bowles's bisexual love interest, a casting choice which Minnelli initially believed was incorrect until she performed with him. Several smaller roles, as well as the remaining four dancers in the film, eventually were cast in West Germany.

Minnelli had auditioned to play Sally in the original Broadway production but was deemed too inexperienced at the time, even though she had won Broadway's Tony Award for Best Actress in a Musical. By the time Cabaret reached the screen, however, Minnelli was a film star having earned an Oscar nomination as the emotionally damaged college student in The Sterile Cuckoo (1969).

For her performance as Sally in the film, Minnelli reinterpreted the character and—at the explicit suggestion of her father, film and stage director Vincente Minnelli—she deliberately imitated film actress Louise Brooks, a flapper icon and sex symbol of the Jazz Age. Brooks, much like the character of Sally Bowles in the film, was an aspiring actress and American expat who temporarily moved to Weimar Berlin in search of international stardom. Minnelli later recalled:

I went to my father and asked him, "What can you tell me about 1930s glamour? Should I be emulating Marlene Dietrich or something?" And he said "No, study everything you can about Louise Brooks."

In particular, Minnelli drew upon Brooks' "Lulu makeup and helmet-like coiffure." For the meeting between Sally Bowles and Brian Roberts, Minnelli modelled her movements and demeanor upon Brooks; in particular, the scene in Pandora's Box (1929) where Brooks' carefree character of Lulu is first introduced. Ultimately, Minnelli would win the Academy Award for Best Actress for her portrayal of Sally Bowles.

=== Filming ===
Fosse and Feuer travelled to West Germany in order to finish assembling the film crew. During this time, Fosse highly recommended Robert L. Surtees for cinematographer, but Feuer and the top executives saw Surtees's work on Sweet Charity as one of the film's many artistic problems. Producers eventually chose British cinematographer Geoffrey Unsworth. Designers Rolf Zehetbauer, Hans Jürgen Kiebach and Herbert Strabel served as production designers. Charlotte Flemming designed costumes. Dancers Kathryn Doby, Louise Quick and John Sharpe were brought on as Fosse's dance aides.

Rehearsals and filming took place entirely in West Germany. For reasons of economy, indoor scenes were shot at the Bavaria Film Studios in Grünwald, outside Munich. Prior to filming, Fosse would complain every afternoon on the set of Willy Wonka & the Chocolate Factory because that film was overrunning and keeping him from starting work on the same stage.

=== Narrative and news reading ===
Although the songs throughout the film allude to and advance the narrative, every song except "Tomorrow Belongs to Me" is executed in the context of a Kit Kat Klub performance. The voice heard on the radio reading the news throughout the film in German was that of associate producer Harold Nebenzal, whose father Seymour Nebenzahl produced such notable Weimar films as M (1931), Testament of Dr. Mabuse (1933), and Threepenny Opera (1931).

== Comparison to source materials ==
The film significantly differs from the Broadway musical. In the stage version, Sally is English (as she was in Isherwood's Goodbye to Berlin). In the film adaptation, she is American. Cliff Bradshaw was renamed Brian Roberts and made British (as was Isherwood, upon whom the character was based), rather than American as in the stage version. The characters and plotlines involving Fritz, Natalia and Max were pulled from I Am a Camera and did not appear in the stage production of Cabaret (or in Goodbye to Berlin).

The most significant change involves the excision of the two main characters: Fraulein Schneider, who runs a boarding house, and her love interest, Herr Schultz, a German grocer. Their doomed romance plot, and the consequences of a Gentile falling in love with a Jew during the rise of antisemitism, was cut. With the removals were "So What?" and "What Would You Do", sung by Schneider, the song "Meeskite", sung by Schultz, and their two duets "It Couldn't Please Me More (The Pineapple Song)" (cut) and "Married" (reset as a piano instrumental, and a phonograph record), as well as a short reprise of "Married", sung alone by Schultz.

Kander and Ebb wrote several new songs and removed others. "Don't Tell Mama" was replaced by "Mein Herr", and "The Money Song" (retained in an instrumental version as "Sitting Pretty") was replaced by "Money, Money." "Mein Herr" and "Money, Money", which were composed for the film, were integrated into the stage musical alongside the original numbers. The song "Maybe This Time", which Sally performs at the cabaret, predates the stage musical, recorded by Minnelli in 1964. Although "Don't Tell Mama" and "Married" were removed as featured musical numbers, both still appear in the film instrumentally: the bridge section of "Mama" is heard playing on Sally's gramophone; "Married" initially plays on the piano in Fraulein Schneider's parlor, and later heard on Sally's gramophone in a German translation ("Heiraten") sung by cabaret singer Greta Keller. Additionally, "If You Could See Her", performed by the MC, originally concluded with the line "She isn't a meeskite at all" onstage. The film changes this to "She wouldn't look Jewish at all," a return to Ebb's original lyrics.

== Soundtrack ==
All tracks are written by John Kander and Fred Ebb.

Cabaret: Original Soundtrack Recording
No.	Title	Performer	Length
1.	"Willkommen"	Joel Grey	4:29
2.	"Mein Herr"	Liza Minnelli	3:36
3.	"Maybe This Time"	Liza Minnelli	3:11
4.	"Money, Money"	Joel Grey, Liza Minnelli	3:04
5.	"Two Ladies"	Joel Grey	3:11
6.	"Sitting Pretty"	Instrumental	2:27
7.	"Tomorrow Belongs to Me"	Mark Lambert	3:06
8.	"Tiller Girls"	Joel Grey	1:41
9.	"Heiraten (Married)"	Greta Keller	3:45
10.	"If You Could See Her"	Joel Grey	3:54
11.	"Cabaret"	Liza Minnelli	3:34
12.	"Finale"	Joel Grey	2:28
Total length:			38:14

== Reception ==
=== Box office ===
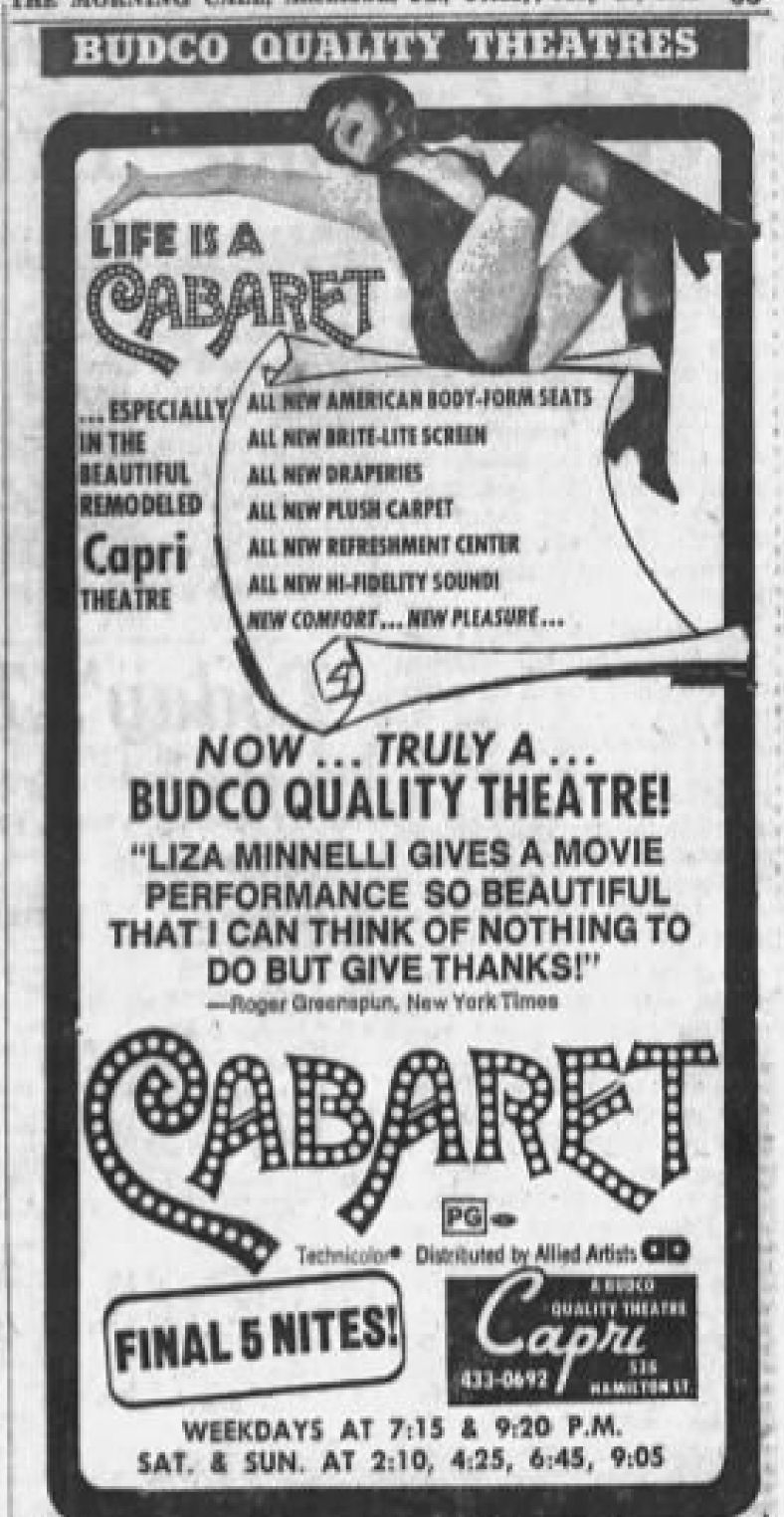
Newspaper ad for the film

The film opened at the Ziegfeld Theatre in New York City on February 13, 1972, with a single performance benefit grossing $2,538. It started regular showings at the Ziegfeld from February 14, grossing $8,684 in its opening day, and a house record $80,278 for the week. It grossed another $165,038 from 6 other theatres in 6 key cities reported by Variety, placing it tenth at the US box office. After seven months of release, it had grossed $5.3 million in the New York metropolitan area. Variety estimated that this represented 30% of the film's total compared to the normal 15% for the market, one of the few big-budget films to perform much better in New York. Based on this estimate, the film had grossed around $17 million. By year end, Variety reported that it had earned theatrical rentals of $10,885,000, making it the eighth most successful film of the year. Following the film's success at the Academy Awards in March 1973, it reached number one at the US box office with a gross of $1,880,000 for the week, a record for Allied Artists. It remained number one for a second week. By May 1973, the film had earned rentals of $16 million in the United States and Canada and $7 million in other countries and reported a profit of $4,904,000. By the end of 1973, Variety had updated the film's rentals in the United States and Canada to $18,175,000.

=== Critical reception ===
==== Contemporary reviews ====
Variety claimed the film received the most "sugary" reviews of the year. Roger Ebert gave a positive review in February 1972, saying: "This is no ordinary musical.... Part of its success comes because it doesn't fall for the old cliche that musicals have to make you happy. Instead of cheapening the movie version by lightening its load of despair, director Bob Fosse has gone right to the bleak heart of the material and stayed there."

A.D. Murphy of Variety wrote "The film version of the 1966 John Kander-Fred Ebb Broadway musical Cabaret is most unusual: it is literate, bawdy, sophisticated, sensual, cynical, heart-warming, and disturbingly thought-provoking. Liza Minnelli heads a strong cast. Bob Fosse's generally excellent direction recreates the milieu of Germany some 40 years ago."

Roger Greenspun of The New York Times wrote in February 1972 that "Cabaret is one of those immensely gratifying imperfect works in which from beginning to end you can literally feel a movie coming to life." Likewise, Pauline Kael of The New Yorker wrote a review that same month in which she applauded the film:

"A great movie musical. Taking its form from political cabaret, it's a satire of temptations. In a prodigious balancing act, Bob Fosse, the choreographer-director, keeps the period—Berlin, 1931—at a cool distance. We see the decadence as garish and sleazy; yet we also see the animal energy in it—everything seems to become sexualized. The movie does not exploit decadence; rather, it gives it its due. With Joel Grey as our devil-doll host—the master of ceremonies—and Liza Minnelli (in her first singing role on the screen) as exuberant, corruptible Sally Bowles, chasing after the life of a headliner no matter what; Minnelli has such gaiety and electricity that she becomes a star before our eyes."

==== Reaction of Isherwood and others ====
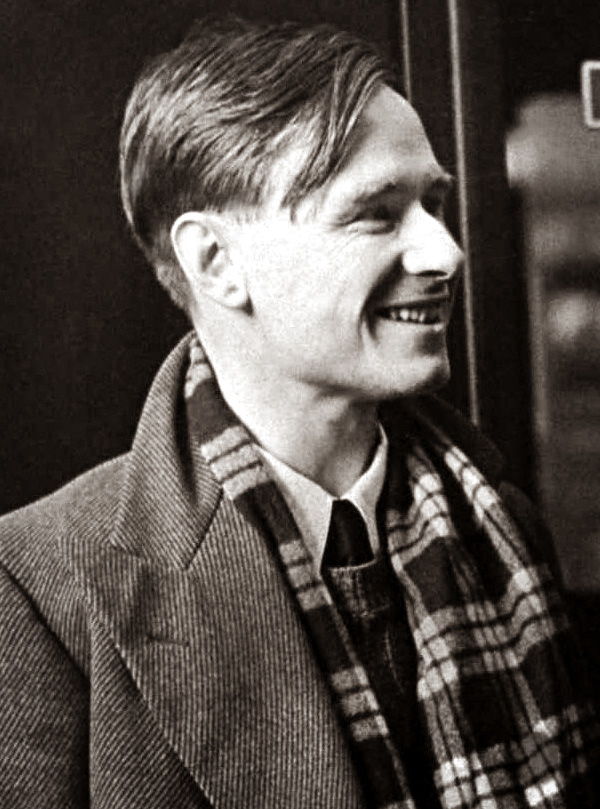
Christopher Isherwood disliked the 1972 film as he felt it depicted homosexuality in a negative light.

Although Cabaret (1972) was well received by film critics upon its release, author Christopher Isherwood and other persons upon whom the film's characters were based were less receptive towards the cinematic adaptation. Isherwood himself was critical of the 1972 film due to what he perceived as its negative portrayal of homosexuality:

"In the film of Cabaret, the male lead is called Brian Roberts. He is a bisexual Englishman; he has an affair with Sally and, later, with one of Sally's lovers, a German baron...Brian's homosexual tendency is treated as an indecent but comic weakness to be snickered at, like bed-wetting."

Similarly, Isherwood's friend Jean Ross—upon whom the character of Sally Bowles was based—was ambivalent about the film. She felt the depiction of 1930s Berlin "was quite, quite different" from reality. Nevertheless, she conceded that the depiction of their social circle of British expatriates as pleasure-seeking libertines was accurate: "We were all utterly against the bourgeois standards of our parents' generation. That's what took us to [Weimar-era] Berlin. The climate was freer there." Such ambivalence towards Cabaret (1972) was not unique among Isherwood's circle.

The poet Stephen Spender lamented how Cabaret (1972) glossed over Weimar Berlin's crushing poverty:

"There is not a single meal, or club, in the movie Cabaret, that Christopher [Isherwood] and I could have afforded [in 1931]. What we mostly knew was the Berlin of poverty, unemployment, political demonstrations and street fighting between forces of the extreme left and the extreme right."

Both Spender and Ross contended that the 1972 film and 1966 Broadway musical deleteriously glamorised the harsh realities of the 1930s Weimar era.

==== Retrospective reviews ====
In 2002, Jamie Russell of the BBC wrote that the film was "the first musical ever to be given an X certificate, Bob Fosse's Cabaret launched Liza Minnelli into Hollywood superstardom and re-invented the musical for the Age of Aquarius." In 2013, film critic Peter Bradshaw listed Cabaret at number one on his list of "Top 10 Musicals", describing it as "satanically catchy, terrifyingly seductive...directed and choreographed with electric style by Bob Fosse...Cabaret is drenched in the sexiest kind of cynicism and decadent despair." In 2024, Forbes ranked Cabaret as the best movie musical of all time.

==== Controversies ====
Although less explicit compared with other films made in the 1970s, Cabaret dealt explicitly with topics like corruption, sexual ambiguity, false dreams, and Nazism. Tim Dirks at Filmsite.org notes: "The sexually-charged, semi-controversial, kinky musical was the first one ever to be given an X rating (although later re-rated) with its numerous sexual flings and hedonistic club life. There was considerable sexual innuendo, profanity, casual sex talk (homosexual and heterosexual), some evidence of anti-Semitism, and even an abortion in the film." It was also rated X in the UK and later re-rated as 15.

On the topic of Nazism, there was little consensus among critics about the possibly fascist implications of the film and play. However, critic Steven Belletto wrote a critique of Cabaret in the journal Criticism, published by Wayne State University Press, in which he highlighted the film's anti-fascist themes, evident both within and outside the musical acts. According to Belletto, "despite the ways that the film has been understood by a variety of critics, [Cabaret] rejects the logic of fascist certainty by staging various numbers committed to irony and ambiguity."

The "Tomorrow Belongs to Me" scene was controversial, with Kander and Ebb, both of whom were Jewish, sometimes being wrongly accused of using a historical Nazi song. The film was censored in West Berlin when it was first released there theatrically, with the sequence featuring the Hitler Youth singing "Tomorrow Belongs to Me" having been deleted. This elimination was made "because of the feeling that it might stir up resentments in the audience by showing the sympathizers for the Nazi movement during the '30s." The sequence was restored, however, when the film was shown on West German television on November 7, 1976 on ZDF.

Another topic of discussion was the song "If You Could See Her", which closed with the line: "If you could see her through my eyes, she wouldn't look Jewish at all." The point of the song was showing anti-Semitism as it begins to run rampant in Berlin, but there were a number of Jewish groups who interpreted the lyrics differently.

== Accolades ==
Cabaret earned a total of ten Academy Award nominations (winning eight of them) and holds the record for most Academy Awards for a film that did not also win Best Picture.

Shortly before the Academy Awards, Bob Fosse won two Tony Awards for directing and choreographing Pippin, his biggest stage hit. Months later, he won the Primetime Emmy Award for choreographing and directing Liza Minnelli's television special Liza with a Z, thereby becoming the first director to win all three awards in one year.

Award	Category	Nominee(s)	Result	Ref.
Academy Awards	Best Picture	Cy Feuer	Nominated	
Academy Awards	Best Director	Bob Fosse	Won	
Academy Awards	Best Actress	Liza Minnelli	Won	
Academy Awards	Best Supporting Actor	Joel Grey	Won	
Academy Awards	Best Screenplay – Based on Material from Another Medium	Jay Presson Allen	Nominated	
Academy Awards	Best Art Direction	Art Direction: Hans Jürgen Kiebach and Rolf Zehetbauer; Set Decoration: Herbert Strabel	Won	
Academy Awards	Best Cinematography	Geoffrey Unsworth	Won	
Academy Awards	Best Film Editing	David Bretherton	Won	
Academy Awards	Best Scoring: Adaptation and Original Song Score	Ralph Burns	Won	
Academy Awards	Best Sound	Robert Knudson and David Hildyard	Won	
American Cinema Editors Awards	Best Edited Feature Film	David Bretherton	Won	
Belgian Film Critics Association	Grand Prix		Won	
Bodil Awards	Best Non-European Film	Bob Fosse	Won	
British Academy Film Awards	Best Film		Won	
British Academy Film Awards	Best Direction	Bob Fosse	Won	
British Academy Film Awards	Best Actress in a Leading Role	Liza Minnelli	Won	
British Academy Film Awards	Best Actress in a Supporting Role	Marisa Berenson	Nominated	
British Academy Film Awards	Best Screenplay	Jay Presson Allen	Nominated	
British Academy Film Awards	Best Art Direction	Rolf Zehetbauer	Won	
British Academy Film Awards	Best Cinematography	Geoffrey Unsworth (Note: Also for Alice's Adventures in Wonderland.)	Won	
British Academy Film Awards	Best Costume Design	Charlotte Flemming	Nominated	
British Academy Film Awards	Best Film Editing	David Bretherton	Nominated	
British Academy Film Awards	Best Soundtrack	David Hildyard, Robert Knudson, and Arthur Piantadosi	Won	
British Academy Film Awards	Most Promising Newcomer to Leading Film Roles	Joel Grey	Won	
British Society of Cinematographers Awards	Best Cinematography in a Theatrical Feature Film	Geoffrey Unsworth	Won	
David di Donatello Awards	Best Foreign Director	Bob Fosse	Won	
David di Donatello Awards	Best Foreign Actress	Liza Minnelli	Won	
Directors Guild of America Awards	Outstanding Directorial Achievement in Motion Pictures	Bob Fosse	Nominated	
Golden Globe Awards	Best Motion Picture – Musical or Comedy		Won	
Golden Globe Awards	Best Actress in a Motion Picture – Musical or Comedy	Liza Minnelli	Won	
Golden Globe Awards	Best Supporting Actor – Motion Picture	Joel Grey	Won	
Golden Globe Awards	Best Supporting Actress – Motion Picture	Marisa Berenson	Nominated	
Golden Globe Awards	Most Promising Newcomer – Female	Marisa Berenson	Nominated	
Golden Globe Awards	Best Director – Motion Picture	Bob Fosse	Nominated	
Golden Globe Awards	Best Screenplay – Motion Picture	Jay Presson Allen	Nominated	
Golden Globe Awards	Best Original Song – Motion Picture	"Mein Herr"; Music by John Kander; Lyrics by Fred Ebb	Nominated	
Golden Globe Awards	Best Original Song – Motion Picture	"Money, Money"; Music by John Kander; Lyrics by Fred Ebb	Nominated	
Kansas City Film Critics Circle Awards	Best Supporting Actor	Joel Grey	Won	
National Board of Review Awards	Top Ten Films		Won	
National Board of Review Awards	Best Film		Won	
National Board of Review Awards	Best Director	Bob Fosse	Won	
National Board of Review Awards	Best Supporting Actor	Joel Grey	Won (Note: Tied with Al Pacino for The Godfather.)	
National Board of Review Awards	Best Supporting Actress	Marisa Berenson	Won	
National Film Preservation Board	National Film Registry		Inducted	
National Society of Film Critics Awards	Best Actress	Liza Minnelli	5th Place	
National Society of Film Critics Awards	Best Supporting Actor	Joel Grey	Won (Note: Tied with Eddie Albert for The Heartbreak Kid.)	
National Society of Film Critics Awards	Best Cinematography	Geoffrey Unsworth	4th Place	
Online Film & Television Association Awards	Film Hall of Fame: Productions		Inducted	
Sant Jordi Awards	Best Performance in a Foreign Film	Liza Minnelli	Won	
Writers Guild of America Awards	Best Comedy – Adapted from Another Medium	Jay Presson Allen	Won	

=== American Film Institute recognition ===
- AFI's 100 Years...100 Songs
  - Cabaret – No. 18
- AFI's Greatest Movie Musicals – No. 5
- AFI's 100 Years...100 Movies (10th Anniversary Edition) – No. 63

=== National Film Registry ===
Inducted into the National Film Registry in 1995 among a list of 25 Films that year.

== Legacy ==
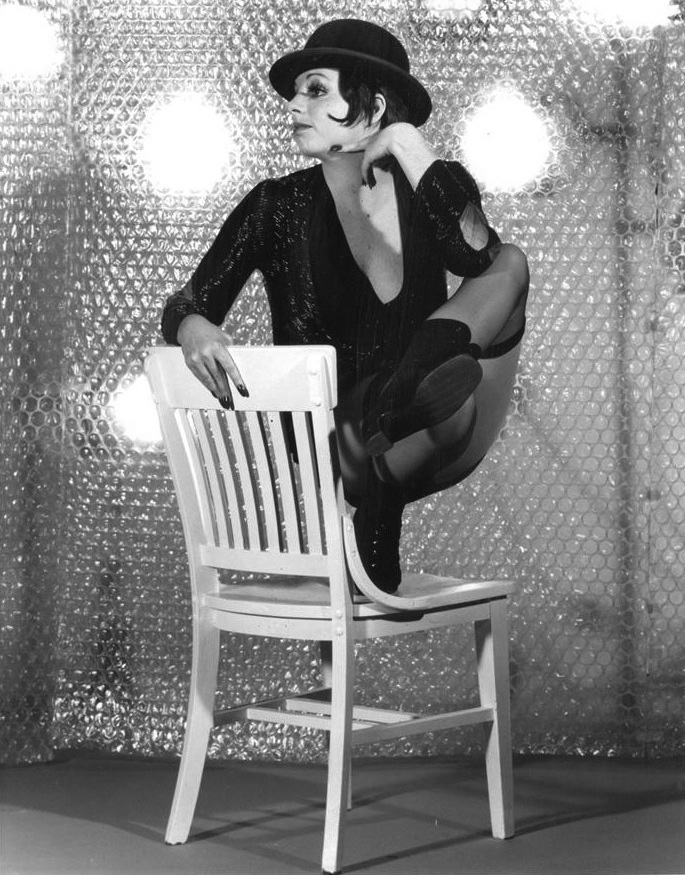
Minnelli reprised the character of Sally Bowles for an encore performance in the 1973 television special Liza with a Z, also directed by Bob Fosse.

Cabaret has been cited by TV Guide as among the greatest films made and in Movieline magazine as one of the "100 Best Movies Ever". It was included in Film4's "100 Greatest Films of All Time" at #78 and in The San Francisco Chronicle's "Hot 100 Films of the Past", being hailed as "the last great musical. Liza Minnelli plays Sally Bowles, an American adrift in pre-Nazi Berlin, in Bob Fosse's stylish, near-perfect film."

David Benedict has written in The Guardian about Cabaret's influence in musical films: "Back then, musicals were already low on film-goers' lists, so how come it was such a success? Simple: Cabaret is the musical for people who hate them. Given the vibrancy of its now iconic numbers – Liza Minnelli in bowler and black suspenders astride a bentwood chair belting out 'Mein Herr' or shimmying and shivering with pleasure over 'Money' with Joel Grey – it sounds strange to say it, but one of the chief reasons why Cabaret is so popular is that it's not shot like a musical."

The film has been listed as one of the most important for queer cinema for its depictions of bisexuality, arguably transgressive at the time of its 1972 post-Code release, and has been credited with turning Liza Minnelli into a gay icon. Film blogs have selected it as "the gayest winner in the history of the Academy." Filmmaker Bill Condon cited the film as a source of inspiration for his 2025 adaptation of Kander and Ebb's stage musical version of Kiss of the Spider Woman.

In a February 2020 article, Vulture named Cabaret as one of "The Best Movies That Lost Best Picture at the Oscars."

=== Home media ===
The film was first released to DVD in 1998. There have been releases in 2003, 2008, and 2012. The film's international ancillary distribution rights are owned by ABC (now part of The Walt Disney Company), Fremantle (UK), Warner Bros. (which acquired the film as part of its purchase of Lorimar Productions, which had acquired the film library of Allied Artists) has US domestic distribution rights.

In April 2012, Warner unveiled a new restoration of the film at the TCM Classic Film Festival. A DigiBook edition was later released on Blu-ray on February 5, 2013. Before this restoration, Cabaret had been sold on a standard-definition DVD from Warner Bros., but the film was unavailable in high-definition or for digital projections in cinemas. The original camera negative is lost, and a surviving interpositive had a vertical scratch that ran through 1,000 feet, or 10 minutes, of one of its reels, as confirmed by Ned Price, vice-president of mastering and restoration for Warner Bros. The damage ostensibly was inflicted by a grain of dirt that had rolled through the length of the reel, beginning with a scene in which Michael York's character confronts a pro-Nazi boarding house resident, and had cut into the emulsion. The marred frames were digitally restored, but "the difficult part was matching the grain structure so the fix was invisible." After automated digital repair attempts failed, the 1,000 feet of damaged film was hand painted using a computer stylus.

Warner Archive Collection reissued the Blu-ray on November 20, 2018, without the DigiBook.

== See also ==
- List of American films of 1972

== Bibliography ==
Francesco Mismirigo, Cabaret, un film allemand, Université de Genève, 1984
