= Tomorrow Belongs to Me =

1966 Broadway musical song

"Tomorrow Belongs to Me" is a song from the 1966 Broadway musical Cabaret and the 1972 film, sung primarily by a Nazi character. It was written and composed by two Jewish musicians – John Kander and Fred Ebb – as part of an avowedly anti-fascist work; the nationalist character of the song serves as a warning to the musical's characters of the rise of Nazism.

== In Cabaret ==
The song appears late in Act I. It is sung by a waiter in the play and a teenage boy in the film, with a crowd joining in as the song progresses. It begins with the tone of a nostalgic German folk song, but develops the character of an intimidating military march as the instrumentation develops and more singers add their voices. In the film, the boy's Hitler Youth uniform is revealed as he sings. Towards the climax, the waiter is seen to wear a swastika armband in the play, and the youth gives a vigorous Nazi salute in the film. As diegetic music, the performance of the song is observed and commented on by the other characters in the musical. In the film, it is also the only song that takes place outside of the confines of the Kit Kat Club, the Berlin nightclub that is the main setting. The song marks the first time that the narrative moves away from the hedonism of the nightclub, and establishes the rise of the Nazi Party as the main theme of the story. The intent is to shock and concern the audience.

The music of the song bears a passing similarity to a 19th-century German song named "Lorelei", with music by Friedrich Silcher to a poem by Heinrich Heine. (Note: Heine was also a Jew; this made it impossible for Nazi Germany to acknowledge his work, so "Lorelei" was mis-attributed in Nazi-era German media as a traditional Volkslied.) The pastoral tone of the lyrics is also somewhat similar; however, the content of the lyrics is entirely different. There is also an authentic Nazi song "Es zittern die morschen Knochen" ("The Frail Bones Tremble"), which, while unmistakably different, contains the lyrics "For today Germany belongs to us/and tomorrow the whole world". The extent to which either of these songs was an influence on Kander and Ebb is not known.

Almost immediately after the first stage performances of Cabaret, it became clear that "Tomorrow Belongs to Me" could widely be misunderstood. There were complaints from people who were insistent that they had heard the song in use as a genuine Nazi anthem. Others seemed to embrace its lyrics at face value, without political context; a Jewish youth group requested permission to use it in their summer camp show. In 1973, concerned parents at a largely Jewish school in New York State raised a petition against the song being included in a school performance; school administrators determined that it would go ahead as planned.

== Subsequent adoption by political groups ==
The National Socialist League, an American neo-Nazi organization, used the slogan "Tomorrow Belongs to You!" in 1974 recruiting advertisements, referencing the popular musical. By the late 1970s, "Tomorrow Belongs to Me" had become an unofficial anthem of the Federation of Conservative Students, a student wing of the British Conservative Party. Alan Clark, a Conservative politician who flirted with the idea of joining the far-right National Front, recalls in his diaries watching the "uplifting" song in a TV airing of the film. When the satirical comedy show Spitting Image looked for a fascist-themed song to satirize the Conservative Party victory in the 1987 United Kingdom general election, they used "Tomorrow Belongs to Me" (with a similar staging of the puppet audience in a beer garden, but the live singing boy wearing a suit, with a bowler hat and umbrella in his arms, and cut through with sarcastic bits of film showing depredation and devastation, with the final lines delivered by the Margaret Thatcher puppet. Before the final chorus, the puppets of Neil Kinnock and Roy Hattersley appear, with the latter asking "Still think you can control them, Neil?")

The song has also been covered by white supremacist bands. The first such cover was in 1979 by Skrewdriver, a British band whose performances have been described as being like Nazi rallies. Skrewdriver's lead singer Ian Stuart Donaldson also covered it with his other bands The Klansmen and Ian Stuart and Stigger. Donaldson was well-known to the German neo-Nazi scene and it is likely he introduced the song to a German neo-Nazi audience. After Donaldson's death, German Rechtsrock bands including Endstufe, Radikahl and Wolfsrudel have recorded versions, Endstufe's being dedicated to Stuart. So have the American duo Prussian Blue and the Swedish singer Saga. Saga's version was cited by Anders Behring Breivik as being among the musical inspirations for his terrorist attacks. "Tomorrow Belongs to Me" could also be frequently heard at rallies for Jörg Haider, the Austrian right-wing nationalist politician. The U.S. alt-right activist Richard B. Spencer appeared to embrace the song as a neo-Nazi anthem: Kander's nephew responded by noting the song was written by a Jew in a same-sex marriage.

In Italy the song was translated as "Il domani appartiene a noi" in 1977 by La compagnia dell'anello, a right-wing band, and was soon adopted as unofficial hymn by Fronte della gioventù, the youth movement of political party M.S.I.

Dominic Lewis composed a cover of the song for the second season of the television adaptation of The Man in the High Castle, intended to fit the unsettling, dystopian atmosphere of the series.
