= Charlotte Flemming =

German costume designer for film and theatre

- Born: 3 July 1920; Weimar, Germany
- Died: 3 March 1993 (aged 72); Munich, Germany
- Occupation: Costume designer
- Years active: 1949–1988
- Notable work: Cabaret (1972)
- Spouse: Günther Anders

Charlotte Flemming (3 July 1920 - 3 March 1993) was a German costume designer for stage and screen. Her prolific career in German and American cinema spanned forty years, though she is best known for her BAFTA-nominated costumes designs for Cabaret (1972).

Flemming was born in Germany and studied fashion and theatre design at the Weimar Academy of Arts. After the Second World War, she began her career as a costume designer at the National Theatre in Weimar, and went on to design ballets, plays and operas at multiple theatres in Berlin. She was married to German cinematographer Günther Anders.

== Costume design for film ==
Charlotte Flemming's first film credit was for Quartett zu fünft (1949), with the director Gerhard Lamprecht. Over the next forty years she would design for over 130 films, distinguishing her as "the busiest costume designer in German film", according to Deutsche Kinemathek.

In 1971, Flemming contributed costumes to Trotta, a period film set in Vienna in the aftermath of the First World War. It was nominated for the Palme d'Or at Cannes and won Germany's Goldene Lola as well as multiple awards for directing and acting. The lead actress Rosemarie Fendal remembered her costume fittings with Flemming, when the design could swiftly "change the dress and me... I have disappeared. The image reflected in the mirror is the part I will play".

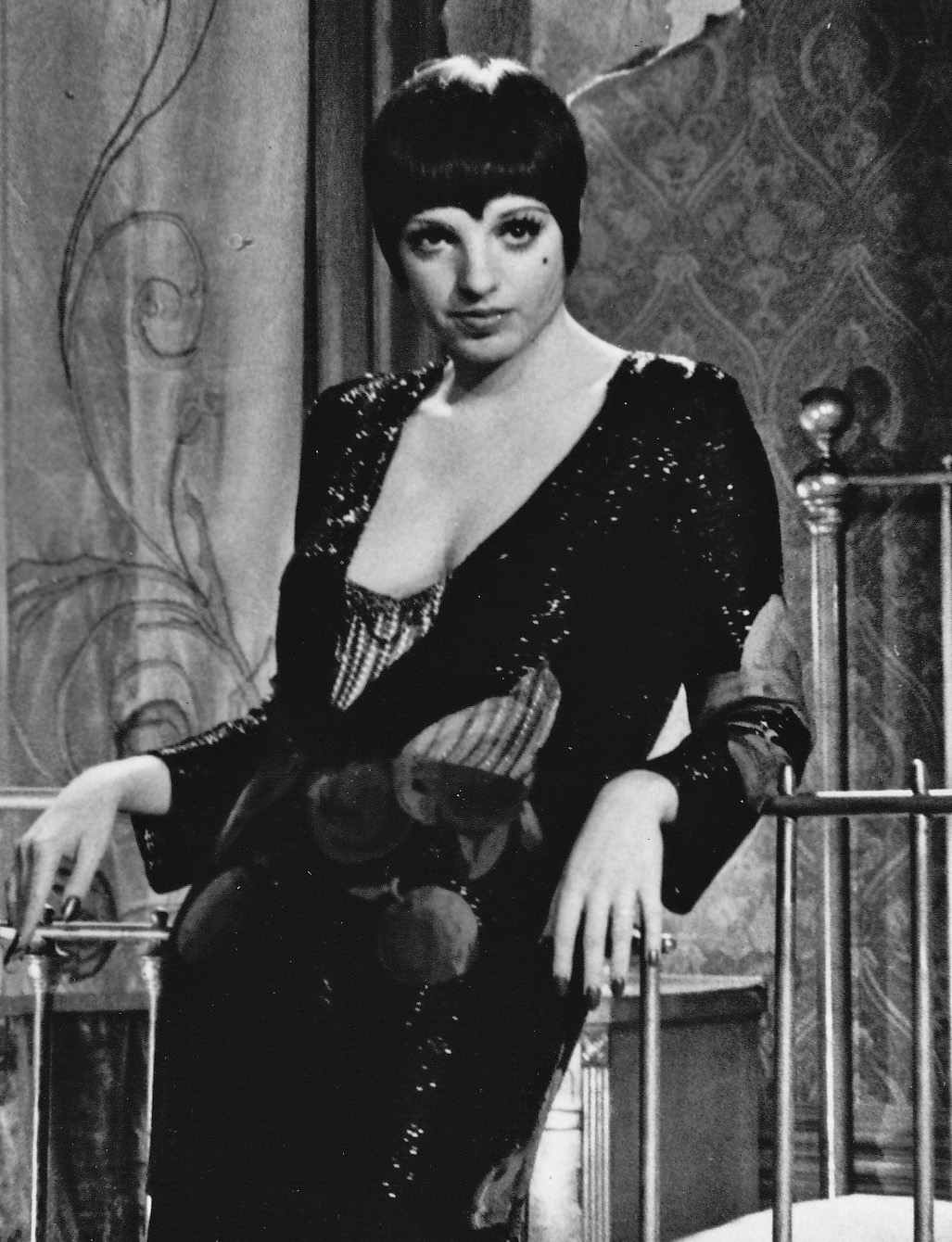
Liza Minnelli as Sally Bowles in Cabaret (1972), with costume design by Charlotte Flemming.

Flemming's best known designs among English-speaking audiences were for Bob Fosse's musical Cabaret (1972). Liza Minnelli played the lead character of Sally Bowles, an American cabaret singer surviving in Weimar Republic-era Berlin. The costumes Flemming designed for Minnelli are memorable for their use of boyish tailoring, black sequins, and references to 1920s trends like Egyptomania. "Charlotte Fleming's costumes - which included bowler hats, stockings and teeny halter-neck dresses" have become "synonymous with the character", according to Tatler. Recent commentators have criticized the use of 1920s fashions for a film set in the 1930s, while recognising that they effectively "emphasize the trashy diva / naive waif sensibilities of Minnelli’s Bowles". Award-winning costume designer Sandy Powell has cited the anachronisms of Cabaret as highly influential, explaining that a shot of Sally's green nail varnish was "not very 1930s at all, but that's what I love about it. I love seeing the 1970s in the 1930s and vice versa".

A couple of years later, Flemming returned to the interwar cabarets of Berlin for The Serpent's Egg (1977) directed by Ingmar Bergman. The main character Manuela has been described as having "a hint of Sally Bowles about her". Bergman credited Flemming with having "tenacity and obsession", qualities that he considered necessary to survival in filmmaking, and would employ her again to design costumes for From the Life of the Marionettes (1980).

Costume historian Deborah Nadoolman Landis noted that Flemming's costume design drawings are "hard-edged", and are distinctive for including scenery, props and interiors behind the drawing of the actor in costume. These contextual details are usually omitted in costume design drawings, in favour of centring a figure drawing of a character against a plan background. Flemming's drawings thus offered a "point of departure and discussion" with directors, according to producer Wolf Schwarz.

Flemming's archive of over 1500 costume designs and 100s of photographs is held in the collection of the Deutsche Kinemathek—Museum für Film und Fernsehen.

== Costume design for opera ==
Charlotte Flemming continued to design stage costumes throughout her career, including touring and festival productions for German companies. In 1961, Flemming designed the costumes for Paul Hager's production of Mozart's Idomenco, one of the first productions to be staged in Salzburg's New Festival Theatre. Flemming's Classical costumes for the opera were inspired by Cretan vases and frescoes. Her designs for Mozart's Cosi fan Tutti, staged for the Edinburgh Festival in 1965 were praised for adding "delightful colour" to the enjoyable production by the Bavarian State Opera.

== Selected filmography ==
- The Devil Makes Three (1952)
- As Long as You're Near Me (1953)
- Robinson soll nicht sterben (1957)
- Face of the Frog (1959)
- Duel with Death (1959)
- Moral 63 (1963)
- Trotta (1971)
- Cabaret (1972)
- The Clown (1976)
- The Serpent’s Egg (1977)
- Die Elixiere Des Teufels (1976)
- Fedora (1978)
- Schloss Konigswald (1988)
