= If You Could See Her =

Song from the 1966 musical "Cabaret"

"If You Could See Her (The Gorilla Song)"

Song
- Written: 1966
- Genre: Vaudeville; Musical theatre; Comedy; Satire
- Composer: John Kander
- Lyricist: Fred Ebb

"If You Could See Her (The Gorilla Song)" is a song from the 1966 Broadway musical Cabaret and its 1972 film adaptation by songwriting team Kander and Ebb. Performed in the middle of the show's second act, (Note: Originally, the song opened the show's third act.) it satirizes the widespread and deepening acceptance of antisemitism in Weimar-era Germany as the Nazi party rose to power.

== Synopsis ==
=== Background ===
Immediately preceding this number is a duet between the characters Herr Schultz, a fruit shop owner, and Fraulein Schneider, who operates a boarding house. Schultz, a Jew, tries to ease Schneider's concerns that the rising acceptance of antisemitism in Germany would, in the event of their interfaith marriage, threaten her business. Schultz's singing is brought to an abrupt end by another character, the Emcee, who drops a brick between the two, symbolizing a brick thrown through the shop window. Schultz tries to reassure her that it is merely rowdy children making trouble, but Fräulein Schneider is afraid.

=== Performance ===
The song is performed by the Master of ceremonies (Emcee) of the Kit Kat Club, a fictional nightclub in Berlin, as he courts and dances with his love interest, another performer in a gorilla costume wearing a dress. Throughout the song, he asks the audience to be open-minded about their relationship, and not judge who someone loves because of their appearance:

Meine Damen und Herren, Mesdames et Messieurs, Ladies and Gentlemen / Is it a crime to fall in love? / Can we ever tell where the heart truly leads us? / All we are asking is ein bisschen Verstandnis / A little understanding / Why can't the world leben and leben lassen / Live and let live?

— The Emcee, Cabaret Act Two, Scene 3

In the final lines of the song ("If you could see her through my eyes, / She wouldn't look Jewish at all"), it is revealed that the gorilla is meant to be a symbolic stand-in for a Jew.

== Reactions ==
The set design in the original 1966 production made use of a large, distorted mirror suspended above the stage. After the Emcee finishes the song, the mirror stops distorting the theater audience, allowing them to see themselves in the moment. According to scholar Bruce Kirle, "the audience was able to witness its individual reactions to this racist joke. Some laughed, some were shocked, while others were simply hypnotized into watching their own reactions and those of their fellow spectators."

In the introduction to the libretto of the 1999 production, editor Linda Sunshine notes:

Up until this number, the musical is filled with the life-force but when Cumming breathes the last line, "She doesn't look Jewish at all", the mood shifts from burlesque to grotesque. We don't know how to react. What have we been laughing at? This, according to Mendes, is when the musical turns into a black-as-pitch play.

=== Changes to lyrics ===
Frank Ebb intended for the song to highlight the growing acceptance of antisemitism, noting that the original final lyric "got an amazing reaction from the audience, because they did laugh, and then they kind of realized what they were laughing at, and they would stop laughing." He elaborates on the lyric being the crux of the piece:

I wanted it to be about anti-Semitism, and it all worked from there, to show how anti-Semitism had crept into the cabaret. That was my intent, and eventually the line "If you could see her through my eyes, / She wouldn't look Jewish at all" generated the whole number.

The final line of the lyric was changed from "she doesn't look Jewish at all" to "she isn't a meeskite (Note: Meeskite (sometimes spelled mieskeit) is a Yiddish word for "ugly", sometimes used as a pejorative towards Jewish women.) at all" by producer and director Harold Prince in reaction to pressure from local Jewish leaders during pre-Broadway runs in Boston. In earlier productions of Cabaret, "Meeskite" was a cut number performed by Schultz which established the term's negative connotation, and in doing so, his identity as a Jew. Joel Grey resented this change during the original run, which he saw as an effort to “soften the blow” and "impact" of the scene. During the pre-Broadway run, he would sometimes "forget" to swap out the original lyric during a performance.

Director Bob Fosse reinstated the original line in the 1972 film, and it is now included in modern productions of the musical.

== Analysis ==
Jay Geller, a professor of Jewish Studies, uses the song as an example in his analysis of the history of antisemitism and ape imagery:

The ape continues to figure ugliness into the present, and so too does the representation of the Jew as ape continue to figure the Jew as ugly: whether confirmed by the often bowdlerized last line of the love duet "If you could see her [through my eyes]" that the Master of Ceremonies at the Kit Kat Club sang to his gorilla-garbed partner—"She wouldn't look Jewish at all"—or the Jewish wedding staged by clowns in orangutan costumes, the groom in suit and kippah, the bride in wedding gown, at Moscow’s Circus Nikulina in 2009.

Warren Hoffman, a professor at Rutgers University, compares the Emcee's role in the number to another Kander and Ebb musical, The Scottsboro Boys:

Kander and Ebb had performed similar work in Cabaret, utilizing the history of 1930s German cabarets as a way to frame a story about anti-Semitism. In The Scottsboro Boys, the unctuousness of Cabaret's Hitler-like emcee has been replaced by the southern "gentility" of the racist Interlocutor. Similarly, just as Cabaret played with its audiences in a song like "If You Could See Her through My Eyes", a number whose punch line compares Jews to gorillas, here too we are asked to think about the minstrel show as a site of simultaneous "amusement" and racial oppression.
