= Kathryn Doby =

Hungarian dancer, actress, choreographer

Kathryn Doby is a Hungarian dancer, actress and choreographer who worked as assistant and dance captain for Bob Fosse. She made her Broadway debut in the ensemble of Fosse's Sweet Charity at its premiere in January 1966 at the Palace Theatre in Times Square. Aside from her performance in the musical Gregory (1970), her work on Broadway continued with Fosse as a Player and Dance Captain in Pippin (1972) and as an assistant to Mr. Fosse for Chicago (1975) and Dancin' (1978). Her film credits include The Night They Raided Minsky's – “Minsky Girl” (1968), The Handmaid's Tale (film) – Aunt Elizabeth (1990), and again worked with Fosse as a dancer in Sweet Charity (1969), Cabaret – Kit Kat Dancer (1972), and All That Jazz – Kathryn (1979).

She re-set the Fosse direction and choreography for the 1981 stage production of Pippin, starring Ben Vereen, William Katt, and Chita Rivera that was filmed for Canadian television network CTV. She was also slated to recreate the choreography for Dancin’ to be revived by the Roundabout Theatre Company in 2009. This production was postponed and, as of the date of this entry, does not have a projected start date. In 2012 Doby returned to New York from her home in California to restage the Dancin’ Act One finale, "Beat Me Daddy Eight to the Bar" for the American Dance Machine for the 21st Century (ADM21). She was joined by original cast members Lloyd Culbreath, Valarie Pettiford, Cady Huffman, Roumel Reaux, and Candace Tovar.
