= Cabaret (musical) =

Stage musical by John Kander, Fred Ebb, and Joe Masteroff

- Original Broadway promotional poster by Tom Morrow
- Music: John Kander
- Lyrics: Fred Ebb
- Book: Joe Masteroff
- Basis: I Am a Camera by John Van Druten; Goodbye to Berlin by Christopher Isherwood
- Premiere: October 10, 1966: Shubert Theatre, Boston
- Productions: See list: 1966 Boston; 1966 Broadway; 1967 US tour; 1968 West End; 1969 US tour; 1986 West End revival; 1987 US tour; 1987 Broadway revival; 1989 US tour; 1998 Broadway revival; 1999 North American tour; 2006 West End revival; 2008 UK tour; 2012 UK tour; 2012 West End revival; 2013 UK tour; 2014 Broadway revival; 2016 North American tour; 2017 UK tour; 2019 UK tour; 2021 West End revival; 2024 Broadway revival
- Awards: 1967 Tony Award for Best Musical; 1967 Tony Award for Best Original Score; 1998 Tony Award for Best Musical Revival; 2022 Olivier Award for Best Musical Revival

Cabaret is an American musical with music by John Kander, lyrics by Fred Ebb, and a book by Joe Masteroff. It is based on the play I Am a Camera by John Van Druten, which premiered in 1951, and which in turn was based on the 1939 novel Goodbye to Berlin by Christopher Isherwood.

Set in 1929–1930 Berlin during the twilight of the Jazz Age as the Nazis rise to power, the musical focuses on the hedonistic nightlife at the seedy Kit Kat Klub and revolves around American writer Clifford Bradshaw's relations with English cabaret performer Sally Bowles. A subplot involves the doomed romance between German boarding house owner Fräulein Schneider and her elderly suitor Herr Schultz, a Jewish fruit vendor. Overseeing the action is the master of ceremonies at the Kit Kat Klub, and the club itself serves as a metaphor for ominous political developments in late Weimar Germany.

The original Broadway production opened on November 20, 1966, at the Broadhurst Theatre in New York City and became a box office hit that ran for 1,166 performances. The production won eight Tony Awards and inspired numerous subsequent productions around the world, including the 1968 West End debut, as well as the 1972 film adaptation.

== Background ==
=== Historical basis ===
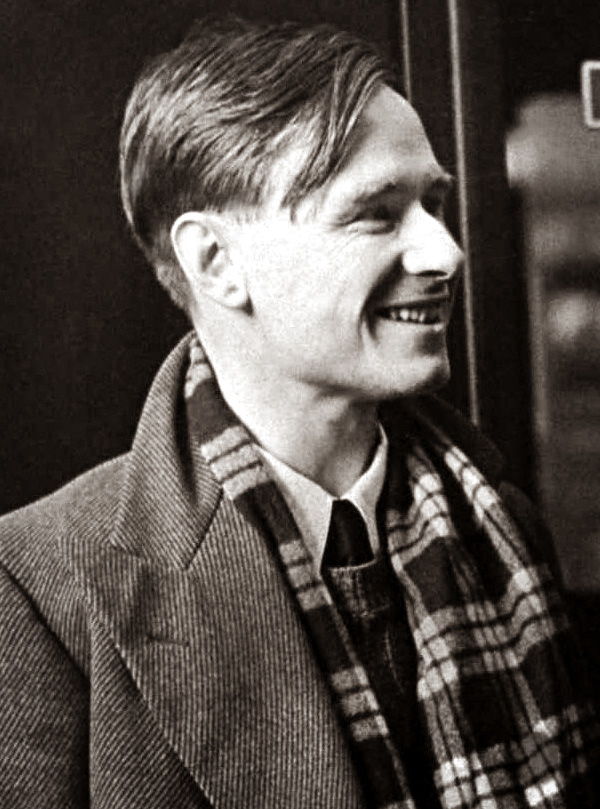
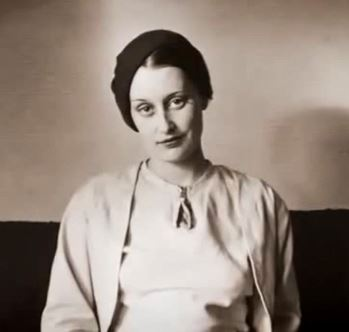
Writer Christopher Isherwood (left) and chanteuse Jean Ross (right) photographed in the 1930s.

The events depicted in the 1966 musical are derived from Anglo-American writer Christopher Isherwood's autobiographical tales of his colorful escapades in the Weimar Republic. In 1929, Isherwood visited Weimar-era Berlin during the final months of the Golden Twenties. He relocated to Berlin to avail himself of boy prostitutes and to enjoy the city's orgiastic Jazz Age cabarets. He socialized with a coterie of gay writers that included Stephen Spender, Paul Bowles, (Note: Paul Bowles was an American writer who wrote the novel The Sheltering Sky. After meeting the author in Berlin, Isherwood appropriated his surname for the character of Sally Bowles.) and W.H. Auden. At the time, Isherwood viewed the rise of Nazism in Germany with political indifference (Note: Jean Ross later claimed the political indifference of the Sally Bowles character more closely resembled Isherwood and his hedonistic friends, many of whom "fluttered around town exclaiming how sexy the storm troopers looked in their uniforms.") and instead focused on writing a novel.

In Berlin, Isherwood shared modest lodgings with 19-year-old British flapper Jean Ross, (Note: Isherwood claimed he and Ross "had a relationship which was asexual but more truly intimate than the relationships between Sally and her various partners in the novel, the plays and the films.") an aspiring film actress who earned her living as a chanteuse in lesbian bars and second-rate cabarets. While room-mates at Nollendorfstrasse 17 in Schöneberg, a 27-year-old Isherwood settled into a sexual relationship with a 16-year-old German boy, and Ross became pregnant after engaging in a series of sexual liaisons. She believed the father of the child to be jazz pianist and later film actor Peter van Eyck.

As a favor to Ross, Isherwood pretended to be her heterosexual lover in order to facilitate an abortion. Ross nearly died from the procedure due to the doctor's incompetence. Visiting Ross during her recovery in a Berlin hospital, Isherwood perceived hostility from the hospital staff who believed that he had forced her to undergo the abortion. These events inspired Isherwood to write his 1937 novella Sally Bowles, in which the abortion serves as the narrative climax.

While Ross recovered from the botched abortion, the political situation rapidly deteriorated in Weimar Germany as the incipient Nazi Party grew stronger day by day. "There was a sensation of doom to be felt in the Berlin streets", Stephen Spender recalled. As Berlin's daily scenes increasingly featured "poverty, unemployment, political demonstrations and street fighting between the forces of the extreme left and the extreme right", Isherwood, Ross, Spender, and other British nationals realized that they must leave the politically volatile country as soon as possible.

Two weeks after the Enabling Act cemented Adolf Hitler's dictatorship, Isherwood fled Germany on May 13, 1933. Afterwards, the Nazis shuttered most of Berlin's seedy cabarets, (Note: Many of Berlin's seedy cabarets located along the Kurfürstendamm avenue, an entertainment-vice district, had been marked for future destruction by Joseph Goebbels as early as 1928.) and many of Isherwood's cabaret acquaintances fled abroad or perished in concentration camps. These events served as the genesis for Isherwood's Berlin stories. In 1951, playwright John Van Druten adapted Isherwood's 1939 novel Goodbye to Berlin into the Broadway play I Am a Camera which in turn became a 1955 film starring Laurence Harvey and Julie Harris.

=== Musical development ===
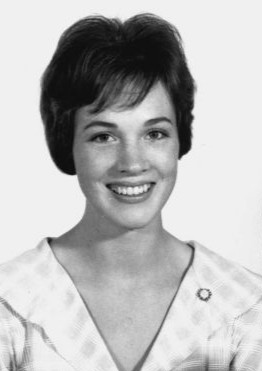
Julie Andrews was offered the role of Sally Bowles, but her manager refused due to the character's immorality.

In early 1963, producer David Black commissioned English composer and lyricist Sandy Wilson to undertake a musical adaptation of Van Druten's 1951 play I Am a Camera. Black hoped that singer Julie Andrews would agree to star in the adaptation, but Andrews' manager refused to allow her to accept the role of Sally Bowles due to the character's immorality. By the time Wilson completed his work, however, Black's option on both the 1951 Van Druten play and its source material by Isherwood had lapsed and been acquired by rival Broadway producer Harold Prince. Prince wished to create a gritty adaptation of Isherwood's stories that drew parallels between the spiritual bankruptcy of Germany in the 1920s and contemporary social problems in the United States at a time "when the struggle for civil rights for black Americans was heating up as a result of nonviolent but bold demonstrations being held in the Deep South."

Prince hired playwright Joe Masteroff to work on the adaptation. Both men believed that Wilson's score failed to capture the carefree hedonism of the Jazz Age in late 1920s Berlin. They wanted a score that "evoked the Berlin of Kurt Weill and Lotte Lenya." Consequently, Prince invited the songwriting team of John Kander and Fred Ebb to join the project. Kander and Ebb envisioned the work as a dramatic play preceded by a prologue of songs describing the Berlin atmosphere from various points of view. As the composers distributed the songs between scenes, they realized the story could be told in the structure of a more traditional book musical, and they replaced several songs with tunes more relevant to the plot.

For the musical adaptation, playwright Joe Masteroff significantly altered Isherwood's original characters. He transformed the English protagonist into an American writer named Clifford Bradshaw; the antisemitic landlady became a tolerant woman with a Jewish beau who owned a fruit store; they cut various supporting characters and added new characters such as the Nazi smuggler Ernst Ludwig (Note: The character of Ernst Ludwig shares similarities with Isherwood's acquaintance, Gerald Hamilton, an unscrupulous smuggler who inspired the fictional character of Arthur Norris. Like the fictional character which he inspired, Hamilton was a "nefarious, amoral, sociopathic, manipulative conniver" who "did not hesitate to use or abuse friends and enemies alike.") for dramatic purposes. The musical ultimately expressed two stories in one: the first, a revue centered on the decadence of the Kit Kat Klub, for which Hal Prince created the Master of Ceremonies (Emcee) character played by Joel Grey; the second, a story set in the society outside the club, thus juxtaposing the lives of the characters based on Isherwood's real-life associates and acquaintances with the seedy club.

In fall 1966, the musical entered rehearsals. After viewing one of the last rehearsals before the company headed to Boston for the pre-Broadway run, Prince's friend Jerome Robbins suggested cutting the songs outside the cabaret, but Prince ignored his advice. In Boston, lead actress Jill Haworth struggled with her characterization of Sally Bowles. Critics thought Sally's blonde hair and white dress suggested a debutante at a senior prom instead of a cabaret singer, so Sally became a brunette before the show opened on Broadway.

Prince staged the show in an unusual way for the time. As the audience entered the theater, they saw the curtain raised, exposing a stage with only a large mirror that reflected the auditorium. Instead of an overture, a drum roll and cymbal crash introduced the opening number. The show mixed dialogue scenes with expository songs and standalone cabaret numbers that provided social commentary. This innovative concept initially surprised audiences. Over time, they discerned the distinction between the two and appreciated the rationale behind them.

== Synopsis ==
=== Act I ===
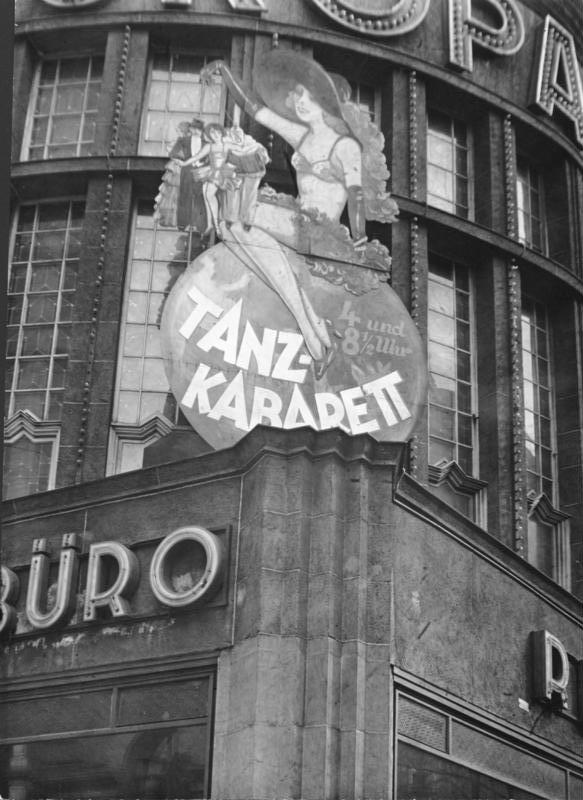

The Kit Kat Klub is intended to evoke the many Weimar-era cabarets in Berlin.

At the twilight of the Jazz Age in Berlin, the incipient Nazi Party is growing stronger. The Kit Kat Klub is a seedy cabaret – a place of decadent celebration. The club's Master of Ceremonies (Emcee), (Note: The phonetic term "Emcee" is specifically used by playwright Joe Masteroff in the musical's script.) together with the cabaret girls and waiters, warms up the audience ("Willkommen"). Meanwhile, a young American writer named Clifford Bradshaw arrives via a railway train in Berlin. He has journeyed to the city to work on a new novel. Cliff encounters Ernst Ludwig, a German smuggler who offers him black market work and recommends a boarding house. At the boarding house, the proprietress Fräulein Schneider offers Cliff a room for one hundred reichsmarks, but he can only pay fifty. After a brief debate, she relents and allows Cliff to live there for fifty marks. Fräulein Schneider observes that she has learned to take whatever life offers ("So What?").

When Cliff visits the Kit Kat Klub, the Emcee introduces an English chanteuse, Sally Bowles, who performs a flirtatious number ("Don't Tell Mama"). (Note: Isherwood insisted Sally be depicted as a mediocre singer to reflect Jean Ross' lack of vocal talent: "She sang badly, without any expression, her hands hanging down at her sides – yet her performance was... effective because of her startling appearance and her air of not caring a curse of what people thought of her.") Afterward, she asks Cliff to recite poetry for her, and he recites Ernest Thayer's mock-heroic poem "Casey at the Bat". Cliff offers to escort Sally home, but she says that her boyfriend Max, the club's owner, is too jealous. (Note: According to Isherwood, Sally Bowles should not be interpreted as a tart. Sally "is a little girl who has listened to what the grown-ups had said about tarts, and who was trying to copy those things".) Sally performs her final number at the Kit Kat Klub aided by a female ensemble of jazz babies ("Mein Herr"). The cabaret ensemble performs a song and dance, calling each other on inter-table phones and inviting each other for dances and drinks ("The Telephone Song"). (Note: Cut in the 1993, 1998, 2012, 2014 and 2021 revivals, replaced by "Mein Herr".)

The next day at the boarding house, Cliff has just finished giving an English lesson to Ernst when Sally arrives. Max has fired her and thrown her out, and now she has no place to live. Sally asks Cliff if she can live in his room. At first he resists, but she persuades him to take her in ("Perfectly Marvelous"). The Emcee and two female companions sing a song ("Two Ladies") that comments on Cliff and Sally's new living arrangement. Herr Schultz, an elderly Jewish fruit-shop owner who lives in the boarding house, gives a pineapple to Fräulein Schneider as a romantic gesture ("It Couldn't Please Me More"). In the Kit Kat Klub, a young waiter starts to sing a song – a patriotic anthem to the Fatherland that slowly descends into a darker, Nazi-inspired marching song ("Tomorrow Belongs to Me"). He initially sings a cappella, before the customers and the band join in. (Note: Changed, in the 1998 and 2014 revivals, to a gramophone solo recording of a boy soprano, with the Emcee speaking the last words. Sung, in the 2021 and 2024 revivals, by the Emcee.)

Months later, Cliff and Sally are still living together and have grown intimate. Cliff knows that he is in a "dream", but he enjoys living with Sally too much to come to his senses ("Why Should I Wake Up?"). Sally reveals that she is pregnant, but she does not know who the father is and decides to have an abortion. Cliff reminds her that it could be his child and tries to persuade her to have the baby ("Maybe This Time"). (Note: Popularized by the 1972 film and added to the stage revivals in 1998, 2012, 2014, and 2021.) Ernst enters and offers Cliff a chance to earn easy money – picking up a suitcase in Paris and delivering it to a client in Berlin. The Emcee comments on this with the song "Sitting Pretty" (or, in later versions, "Money").

Meanwhile, Fräulein Schneider has caught one of her boarders, the prostitute Fräulein Kost, bringing sailors into her room. Fräulein Schneider forbids her from doing so again, but Kost threatens to leave. Kost reveals that she has seen Fräulein Schneider with Herr Schultz in her room. Herr Schultz saves Fräulein Schneider's reputation by telling Fräulein Kost that he and Fräulein Schneider are to be married in three weeks. After Fräulein Kost departs, Fräulein Schneider thanks Herr Schultz for lying to Fräulein Kost. Herr Schultz says that he still wishes to marry Fräulein Schneider ("Married").

At Fräulein Schneider and Herr Schultz's engagement party, Cliff arrives and delivers the suitcase of contraband to Ernst. Sally and Cliff gift the couple a crystal fruit bowl. A tipsy Schultz sings "Meeskite" (meeskite, he explains, is Yiddish for ugly or funny-looking), a song with a moral ("Anyone responsible for loveliness, large or small / Is not a meeskite at all"). (Note: Cut in the 1993 1987, 1998, 2012, 2014 and 2021 revivals.) Afterward, seeking revenge on Fräulein Schneider, Kost tells Ernst, who now sports a Nazi armband, that Schultz is a Jew. Ernst warns Schneider that marrying a Jew is unwise. Kost and company reprise "Tomorrow Belongs to Me", with more overtly Nazi overtones, as Cliff, Sally, Schneider, Schultz, and the Emcee look on.

=== Act II ===
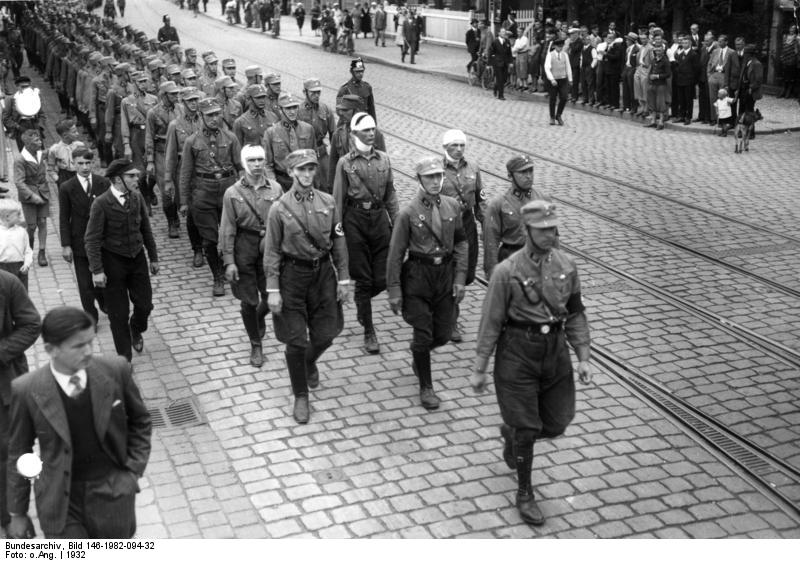

The musical is set against the backdrop of Nazism's rise in Germany which reaches a climax at the end of the second act.

The cabaret girls – along with the Emcee in drag – perform a kickline routine which eventually becomes a goose step. Fräulein Schneider expresses her concerns about her impending nuptials to Herr Schultz, who assures her that everything will be all right ("Married" (reprise)). (Note: Cut in the 2012 revival.) They are interrupted by the crash of a brick being thrown through the glass window of Herr Schultz's fruit shop. Schultz tries to reassure her that it is merely rowdy children making trouble, but Fräulein Schneider is now afraid.

Back at the Kit Kat Klub, the Emcee performs a song-and-dance routine with a woman in a gorilla suit, singing that their love has been met with universal disapproval ("If You Could See Her"). Encouraging the audience to be more open-minded, he defends his ape-woman, concluding with, "if you could see her through my eyes... she wouldn't look Jewish at all." (Note: The line "if you could see her through my eyes... she wouldn't look Jewish at all" was intended to illustrate how easily prejudice is accepted. However, boycott threats from Jewish leaders in Boston led Ebb to write an alternate line, "She isn't a Meeskite at all.") Fräulein Schneider goes to Cliff and Sally's room and returns their engagement present, explaining that her marriage has been called off. When Cliff protests and states that she can't just give up this way, she asks him what other choice she has ("What Would You Do?").

Cliff begs Sally to leave Germany with him so that they can raise their child together in America. Sally protests and claims that their life in Berlin is wonderful. Cliff urges her to "wake up" and to notice the growing social upheaval around them. Sally retorts that politics have nothing to do with them and returns to the Kit Kat Klub ("I Don't Care Much"). (Note: Added for the 1987, 1993, 1998, 2012, 2014 and 2021 revivals.) At the club, after another heated argument with Sally, Cliff is accosted by Ernst, who has another delivery job for him. Cliff tries to brush him off. When Ernst inquires if Cliff's attitude towards him is because of "that Jew at the party", Cliff attacks him – only to be beaten by Ernst's bodyguards and ejected from the club. (Note: Although the musical depicts Clifford Bradshaw as staunchly anti-racist, Christopher Isherwood was alleged to be an antisemite. According to biographers, Isherwood was "fairly anti-Semitic to a degree that required some emendations of the Berlin novels when they were republished after the war".) On stage, the Emcee introduces Sally, who enters to perform again, singing that "life is a cabaret, old chum," cementing her decision to live in carefree ignorance ("Cabaret").

The next morning, a bruised Cliff is packing his clothes in his room when Herr Schultz visits. He informs Cliff that he is moving to another boarding house, but he is confident that these difficult times will soon pass. He understands the German people, he declares, because he is a German too. When Sally returns, she announces that she has had an abortion, and Cliff slaps her. She chides him for his previous insistence on keeping the baby, pointing out it would be a "terrible burden" for a child knowing it was the only reason the parents were together. Cliff still hopes that she will join him in France, but Sally retorts that she has "always hated Paris." She hopes that, when Cliff finally writes his novel, he will dedicate the work to her. Cliff leaves, heartbroken.

There was a cabaret, and there was a master of ceremonies and there was a city called Berlin, in a country called Germany – and it was the end of the world.

— Cliff Bradshaw, Cabaret, Act II

On the railway train to Paris, Cliff begins to compose his novel, reflecting on his experiences: "There was a cabaret, and there was a master of ceremonies ... and there was a city called Berlin, in a country called Germany – and it was the end of the world and I was dancing with Sally Bowles – and we were both fast asleep" ("Willkommen" (reprise)). In the Kit Kat Klub, the Emcee welcomes the audience once again as the ensemble reprises "Willkommen" but the song is now harsh and discordant. (Note: In some versions of the show, Herr Schultz, Fräulein Schneider, and Sally repeat lines from earlier in the show espousing their views: Schultz's belief that he will survive, Schneider choosing safety in the face of oppression, and Sally choosing to ignore politics as she sings a brief reprise of "Cabaret".) The Emcee sings, "Auf Wiedersehen... à bientôt..." (Note: In the 1998 revival, the Emcee strips off his overcoat to reveal a concentration camp prisoner's uniform marked with a yellow Star of David and a pink triangle, and the backdrop raises to reveal a white space with the ensemble standing within.) followed by a drum roll crescendo and a cymbal crash. (Note: Several productions feature a finale with a white space flashing with a strobe effect, implying the cabaret performers – except for Sally who is not standing in the white space – will fall victim to Nazi atrocities towards the Jews and gays.)

== Musical numbers ==
Every production of Cabaret has modified the original score, with songs being changed, cut, or added from the 1972 film version. This is a collective list featuring all songs from every major production.

Act I

- "Willkommen" – Emcee and Company
- "So What?" – Fräulein Schneider
- "Telephone Song"/"Telephone Dance" – Cliff and Company
- "Don't Tell Mama" – Sally and the Girls
- "Mein Herr" – Sally and the Girls
- "Perfectly Marvelous" – Sally and Cliff
- "Two Ladies" (Note: The character Bobby replaced one of the ladies in the song for the 1998 and 2014 revivals.) – Emcee and Two Ladies (Note: Typically they are "Rosie" and "Frenchie".)
- "It Couldn't Please Me More (A Pineapple)" – Fräulein Schneider and Herr Schultz
- "Tomorrow Belongs to Me" – Emcee and Waiters
- "Why Should I Wake Up?" – Cliff
- "Don't Go" (Note: Replaced "Why Should I Wake Up?" in the 1987 revival but removed from the score afterwards.) – Cliff
- "Maybe This Time" – Sally
- "Sitting Pretty" (Note: "Money, Money", a song from the 1972 film, was blended with "Sitting Pretty" in the 1987 revival. It replaced "Sitting Pretty" in the 1998, 2014 and 2021 revivals.) – Emcee and Kit Kats
- "Money" – Emcee and the Cabaret Girls
- "Married" (Note: In the 1998 revival, Fräulein Kost sang the film's German translation of "Married" after two English verses.) – Fräulein Schneider and Herr Schultz
- "Meeskite" – Herr Schultz and Sally
- "Tomorrow Belongs to Me" (reprise) – Fräulein Kost, Ernst Ludwig and Guests

Act II

- "Entr'acte"/"Kickline" – Emcee and the Girls
- "Married" (reprise) – Herr Schultz
- "If You Could See Her (The Gorilla Song)" – Emcee
- "What Would You Do?" – Fräulein Schneider
- "I Don't Care Much" – Emcee
- "Cabaret" – Sally
- "Willkommen" (reprise)/"Finale Ultimo" – Emcee, Cliff, and Company

=== Song modifications ===
Many songs planned for the 1966 production were cut. Three excised songs – "Good Time Charlie", "It'll All Blow Over", and "Roommates" – were recorded by Kander and Ebb, and the sheet music published in a collector's book. Sally sang "Good Time Charlie" to Cliff as they walked to Fräulein Schneider and Herr Schultz's engagement party, mocking Cliff for his gloominess. At the end of the first act, Fräulein Schneider sang "It'll All Blow Over," expressing her concerns about marrying a Jew, while Cliff voiced his worries about Germany's emerging Nazism. In the song, Sally declares that all will turn out well in the end. "Perfectly Marvelous" replaced "Roommates" and serves the same plot function of Sally convincing Cliff to let her move in with him.

The 1972 film added several songs, notably "Mein Herr" and "Maybe This Time" which were included in later productions. The latter song had been written by Kander and Ebb for the unproduced musical Golden Gate. The later 1987 and 1998 Broadway revivals also added new songs such as "I Don't Care Much". In the 1987 revival, Kander and Ebb wrote a new song for Cliff titled "Don't Go". In the 1998 revival, "Mein Herr" replaced "The Telephone Song", and "Maybe This Time" replaced "Why Should I Wake Up?".

Originally, the Emcee sang "Sitting Pretty" accompanied by the cabaret girls in international costumes with their units of currency representing Russian rubles, Japanese yen, French francs, American dollars, and German reichsmarks. In the 1972 film, the Emcee and Sally Bowles sang "Money, Money" instead of "Sitting Pretty." The film soundtrack briefly played "Sitting Pretty" as orchestral background music. In the 1987 revival, they presented a special version that combined a medley of both money songs, and they incorporated motifs from the later song into the "international" dance that featured "Sitting Pretty." In the 1998 revival, they used only the later song written for the film. This version included the cabaret girls and carried a darker undertone.

== Productions ==
=== Original Broadway production ===
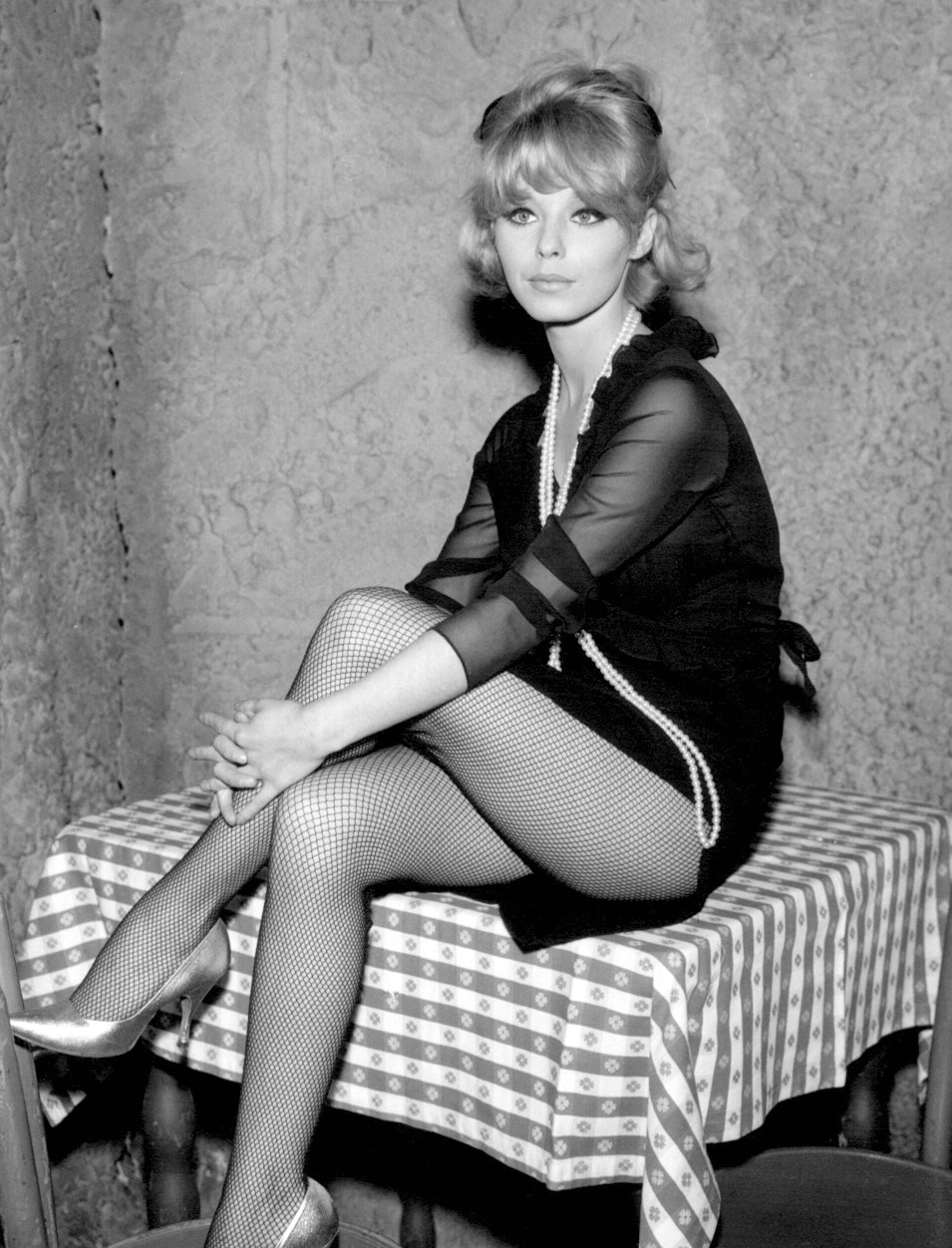
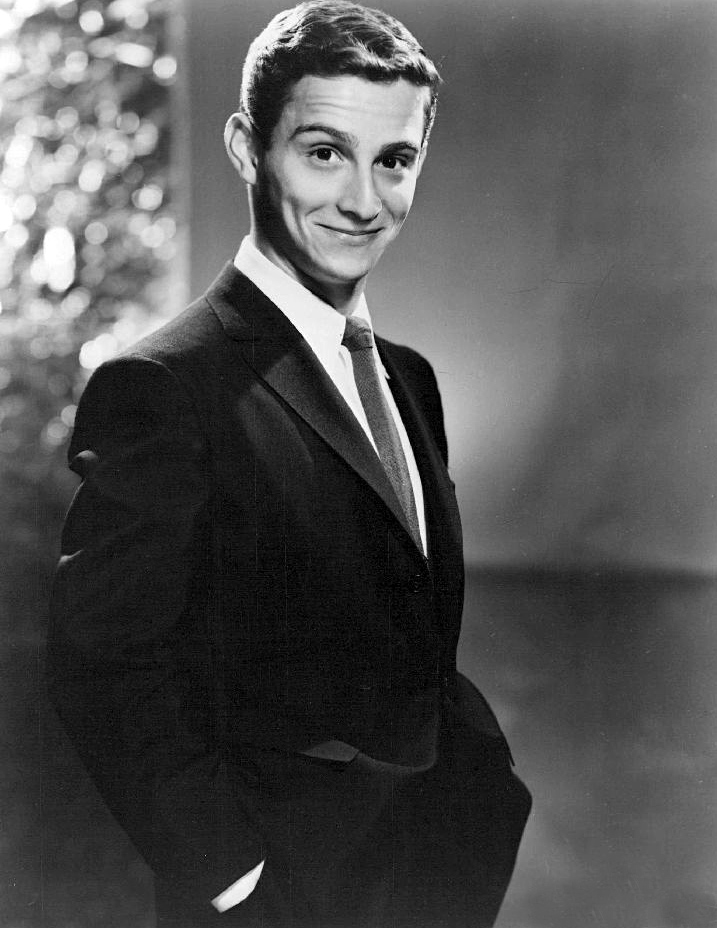
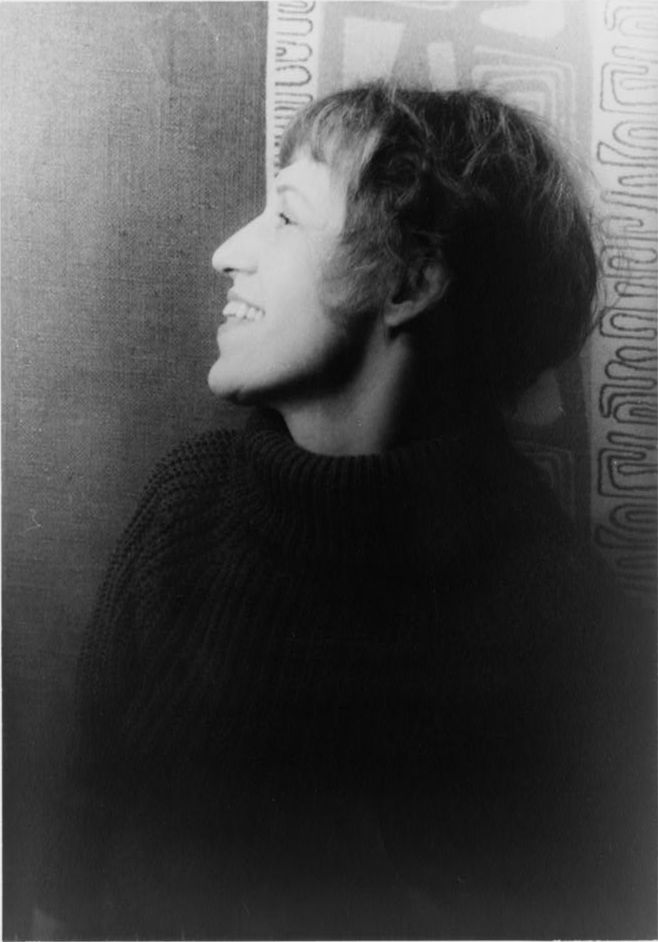
The original production featured Jill Haworth (left) as Sally Bowles, Joel Grey (center) as the Emcee, and Lotte Lenya (right) as Fräulein Schneider.

The musical opened on Broadway on November 20, 1966, at the Broadhurst Theatre, transferred to the Imperial Theatre and then the Broadway Theatre before closing on September 6, 1969, after 1,166 performances and 21 previews. Directed by Harold Prince and choreographed by Ron Field, the cast featured Jill Haworth as Sally, Bert Convy as Cliff, Lotte Lenya as Fräulein Schneider, Jack Gilford as Herr Schultz, Joel Grey as the Emcee, Edward Winter as Ernst, and Peg Murray as Fräulein Kost. Replacements later in the run included Anita Gillette and Melissa Hart as Sally, Ken Kercheval and Larry Kert as Cliff, and Martin Ross as the Emcee. In addition, John Serry Sr. performed as the orchestral accordionist.

The original Broadway production was not an instant success according to playwright Joe Masteroff due to its perceived immoral content. "When the show opened in Boston," Masteroff recalled, "there were a lot of walkouts. Once the reviews came out, the public came back." At the time, actor Joel Grey was merely fifth-billed in the show. Nevertheless, audiences were hypnotized by Grey's sinister performance as the Emcee.

In contrast, Jill Haworth's performance as Sally was less well-received and was criticized for its blandness. Emory Lewis, the reviewer for The Morning Call, wrote that "Jill Haworth, the lovely English actress who played Sally Bowles on opening night, was personable, but she was not sufficiently trained for so pivotal a role. And her voice was small and undramatic. Her performance threw Cabaret out of kilter."

The 1967–68 US national tour featured Melissa Hart as Sally, Signe Hasso as Fräulein Schneider, and Leo Fuchs as Herr Schultz. The tour included the Shubert Theatre in New Haven, Connecticut in December 1967, the Ahmanson Theatre in Los Angeles in May 1968, the Curran Theatre in San Francisco in September 1968, and many others.

=== Original West End production ===
The first West End production opened on February 28, 1968, at the Palace Theatre with Judi Dench as Sally, Kevin Colson as Cliff, Barry Dennen as the Emcee, Lila Kedrova as Fräulein Schneider and Peter Sallis as Herr Schultz. It ran for 336 performances. Critics such as Ken Mandelbaum have asserted that "Judi Dench was the finest of all the Sallys that appeared in Hal Prince's original staging, and if she's obviously not much of a singer, her Sally is a perfect example of how one can give a thrilling musical theatre performance without a great singing voice."

=== 1986 West End revival ===
Kelly Hunter as Sally Bowles, 1986

In 1986, the show was revived in London at the Strand Theatre starring Kelly Hunter as Sally, Peter Land as Cliff and Wayne Sleep as the Emcee, directed and choreographed by Gillian Lynne.

=== 1987 Broadway revival ===
The first Broadway revival opened on October 22, 1987, with direction and choreography by Prince and Field. The revival opened at the Imperial Theatre, and then transferred to the Minskoff Theatre to complete its 261-performance run. Joel Grey received star billing as the Emcee, with Alyson Reed as Sally, Gregg Edelman as Cliff, Regina Resnik as Fräulein Schneider, Werner Klemperer as Herr Schultz, and David Staller as Ernst Ludwig. The song "Don't Go" was added for Cliff's character.

=== 1993 London revival ===
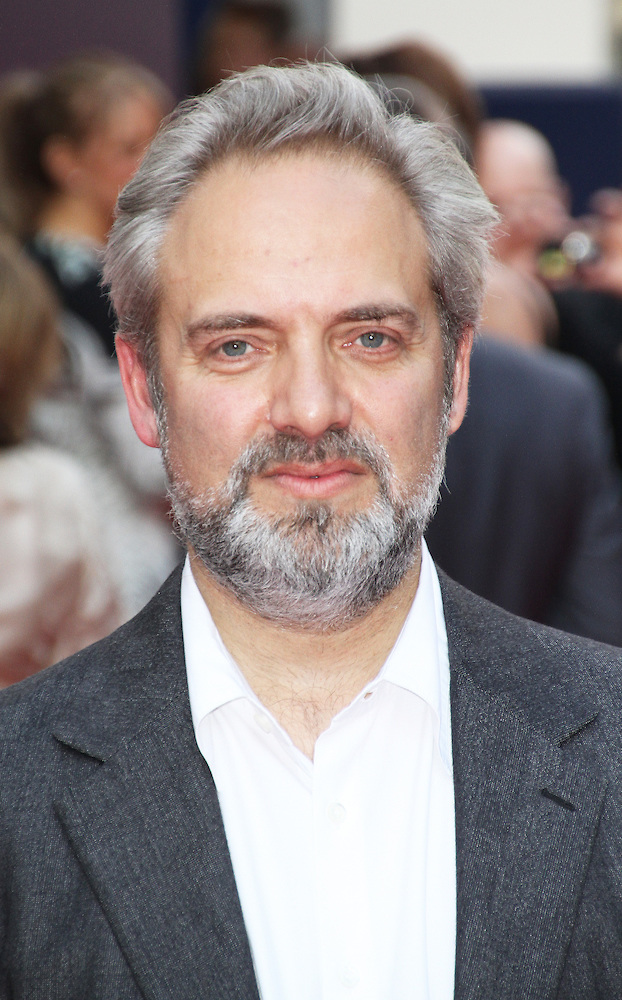
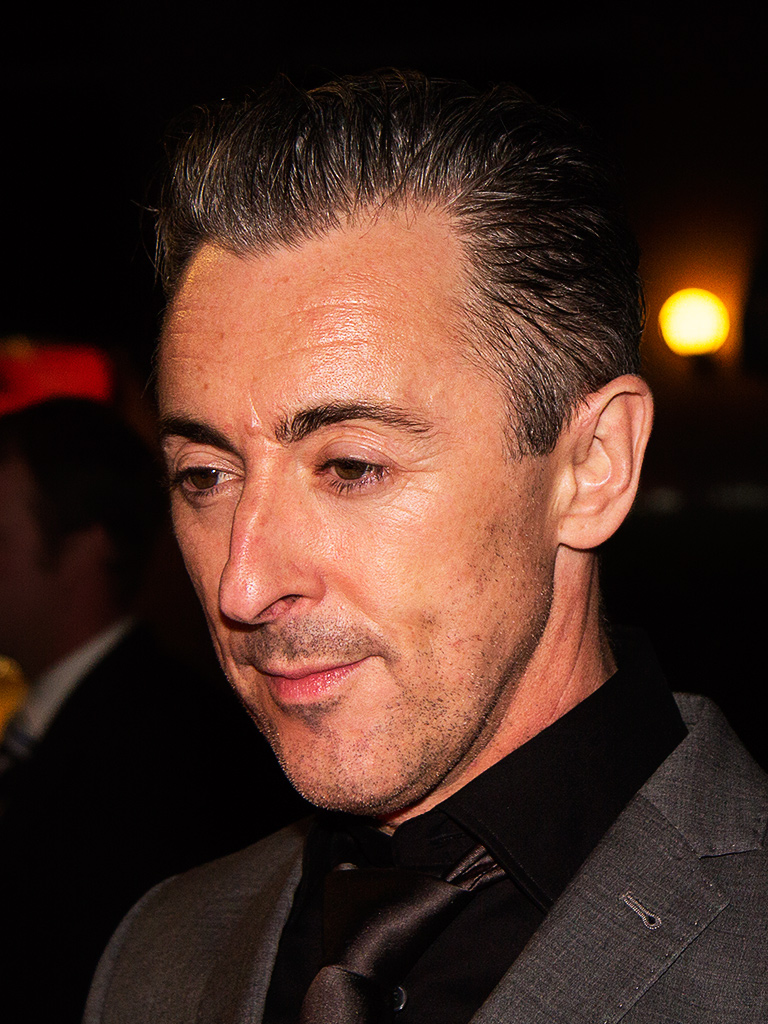
Sam Mendes (left) directed the 1993 London revival of Cabaret with Alan Cumming (right) as the Emcee. Cumming would return as the Emcee for the 1998 and 2014 Broadway revivals.

In 1993, Sam Mendes directed a new production for the Donmar Warehouse in London. The revival starred Jane Horrocks as Sally, Adam Godley as Cliff, Alan Cumming as the Emcee and Sara Kestelman as Fräulein Schneider. Kestelman won the Olivier Award for Best Supporting Performance in a Musical, and Cumming was nominated for an Olivier. Mendes' concept was different from either the original production or the conventional first revival, particularly with respect to the character of the Emcee. The role, as played by Joel Grey in both prior productions, was a sexually aloof, edgy character with rouged cheeks dressed in a tuxedo. Alan Cumming's portrayal was highly sexualized, as he wore suspenders around his crotch and red paint on his nipples. Staging details differed as well. Instead of "Tomorrow Belongs to Me" being performed by a male choir of waiting staff, the Emcee plays a recording of a boy soprano singing it. In the final scene, the Emcee removes his outer clothes to reveal a striped uniform of the type worn by the internees in concentration camps; on it are pinned a yellow badge (identifying Jews), a red star (marking Communists and socialists), and a pink triangle (denoting homosexuals). Other changes included added references to Cliff's bisexuality, including a brief scene where he kisses one of the cabaret boys. "I Don't Care Much," which was added for the 1987 Broadway revival, was maintained for this production, and "Mein Herr" was added from the film.

This production was filmed by Channel Four Film for airing on UK television.

=== 1998 Broadway revival ===
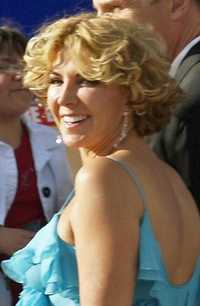
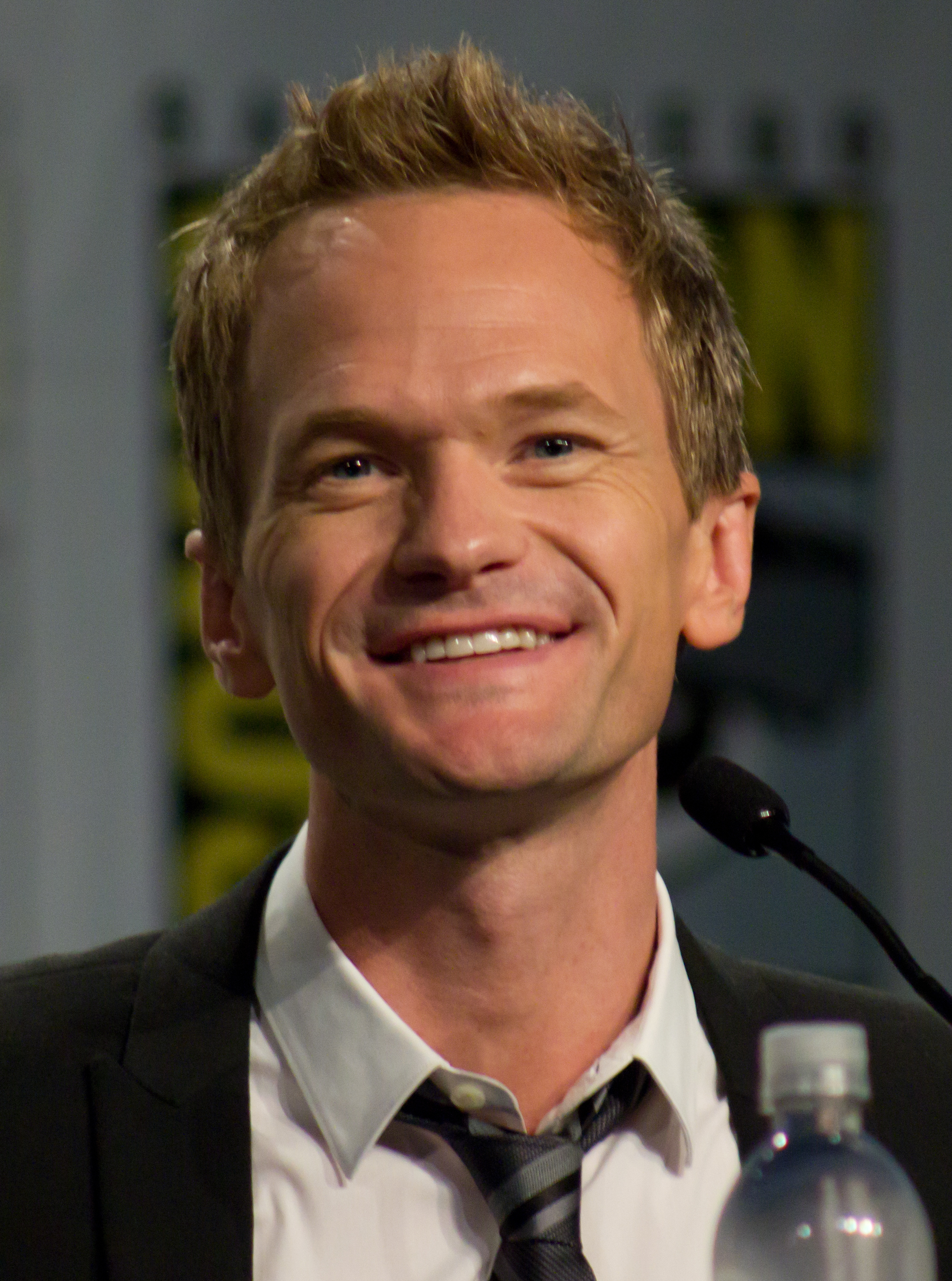
Natasha Richardson portrayed Sally Bowles in the 1998 revival, and Neil Patrick Harris later starred as the Emcee after Alan Cumming departed the role.

The second Broadway revival, by the Roundabout Theatre Company, was based on the 1993 Mendes-Donmar Warehouse production. For the Broadway transfer, Rob Marshall was co-director and choreographer. The production opened after 37 previews on March 19, 1998, at the Kit Kat Klub, housed in what previously had been known as Henry Miller's Theatre. Later that year it transferred to Studio 54, where it remained for the rest of its 2,377-performance run, becoming the third longest-running revival in Broadway musical history, third only to Oh! Calcutta! and Chicago. Cumming reprised his role as the Emcee, opposite newcomers Natasha Richardson as Sally, John Benjamin Hickey as Cliff, Ron Rifkin as Herr Schultz, Denis O'Hare as Ernst Ludwig, Michele Pawk as Fräulein Kost, and Mary Louise Wilson as Fräulein Schneider.

The Broadway production was nominated for ten Tony Awards, winning four for Cumming, Richardson and Rifkin, as well as the Tony for Best Revival of a Musical. This production featured a number of notable replacements later in the run: Susan Egan, Joely Fisher, Gina Gershon, Debbie Gibson, Milena Govich, Jennifer Jason Leigh, Melina Kanakaredes, Jane Leeves, Molly Ringwald, Brooke Shields, and Lea Thompson as Sally; Michael C. Hall, Raúl Esparza, Neil Patrick Harris, Adam Pascal, Jon Secada, and John Stamos as the Emcee; Boyd Gaines, Michael Hayden, and Rick Holmes as Cliff; Tom Bosley, Dick Latessa, Hal Linden, Laurence Luckinbill, and Tony Roberts as Herr Schultz; and Blair Brown, Carole Shelley, Polly Bergen, Alma Cuervo, Mariette Hartley as Fräulein Schneider, and Martin Moran as Ernst Ludwig.

There were a number of changes made between the 1993 and 1998 revivals, despite the similarities in creative team. The cabaret number "Two Ladies" was staged with the Emcee, a cabaret girl, and a cabaret boy in drag and included a shadow play simulating various sexual positions. The score was re-orchestrated using synthesizer effects and expanding the stage band, with all the instruments now being played by the cabaret girls and boys. The satiric "Sitting Pretty", with its mocking references to deprivation, despair and hunger, was eliminated, as it had been in the film version, and where in the 1993 revival it had been combined with "Money" (as it had been in 1987 London production), "Money" was now performed on its own. "Maybe This Time", from the film adaptation, was added to the score.

=== 2006 West End revival ===
In September 2006, a new production presented by Bill Kenwright opened at the Lyric Theatre, directed by Rufus Norris, and starring Anna Maxwell Martin as Sally, James Dreyfus as the Emcee, Harriet Thorpe as Fräulein Kost, Michael Hayden as Cliff, and Sheila Hancock as Fräulein Schneider. Hancock won the Olivier Award for Best Supporting Performance in a Musical. Replacements later in the run included Kim Medcalf and Amy Nuttall as Sally, Honor Blackman and Angela Richards as Fräulein Schneider, and Julian Clary and Alistair McGowan as the Emcee. This production closed in June 2008 and toured the UK for two years opening at the Birmingham Repertory Theatre with a cast that included Wayne Sleep as the Emcee and Samantha Barks as Sally, before Siobhan Dillon took over the role.

=== 2012 West End revival ===
A revival opened in the West End at the Savoy Theatre on October 3, 2012, following a four-week tour of the UK, including Bromley, Southampton, Nottingham, Norwich and Salford, with Will Young as the Emcee and Michelle Ryan as Sally Bowles. Siân Phillips, Harriet Thorpe and Matt Rawle also joined the cast. The production was made by the creative team behind the 2006 London revival, but with new sets, lighting, costumes, choreography and direction.

In August 2013 the show went on tour in the UK, again with Young as the Emcee, Siobhan Dillon reprising her role of Sally and Lyn Paul joining the cast as Fräulein Schneider. The same production toured the UK again in autumn 2017 with Young as the Emcee and Louise Redknapp as Sally. Another UK tour began in autumn 2019 starring John Partridge as the Emcee, Kara Lily Hayworth as Sally Bowles and Anita Harris as Fräulein Schneider.

=== 2014 Broadway revival ===
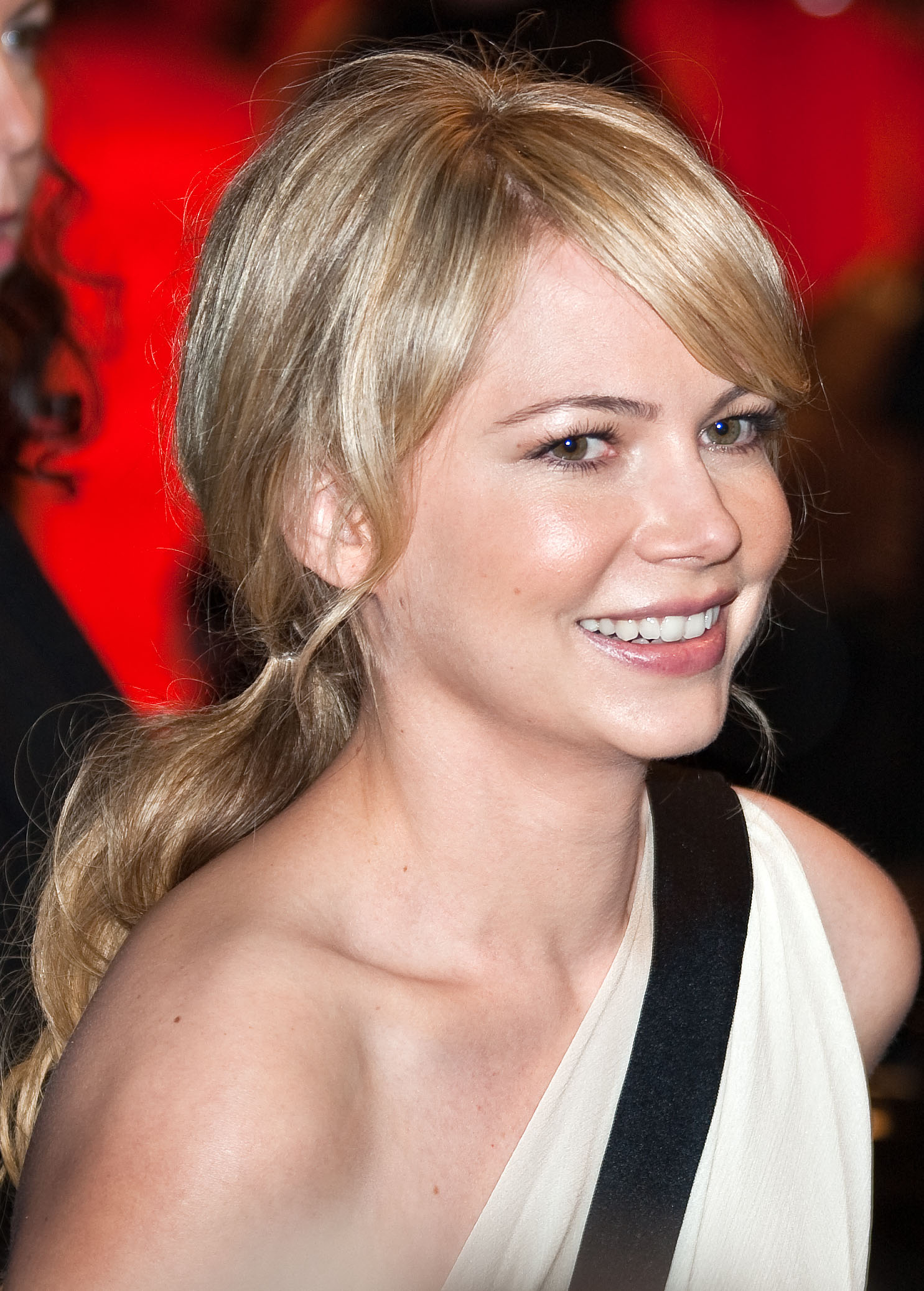
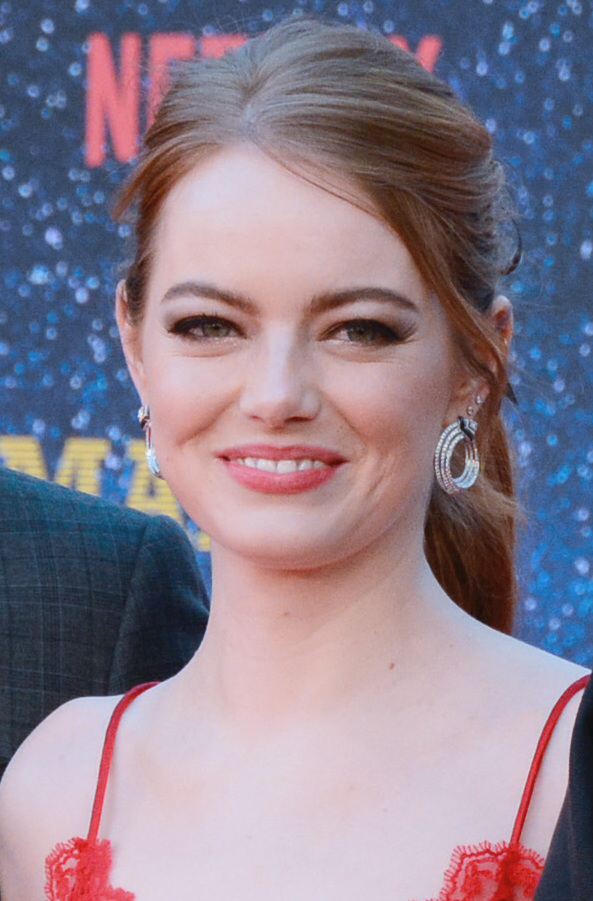
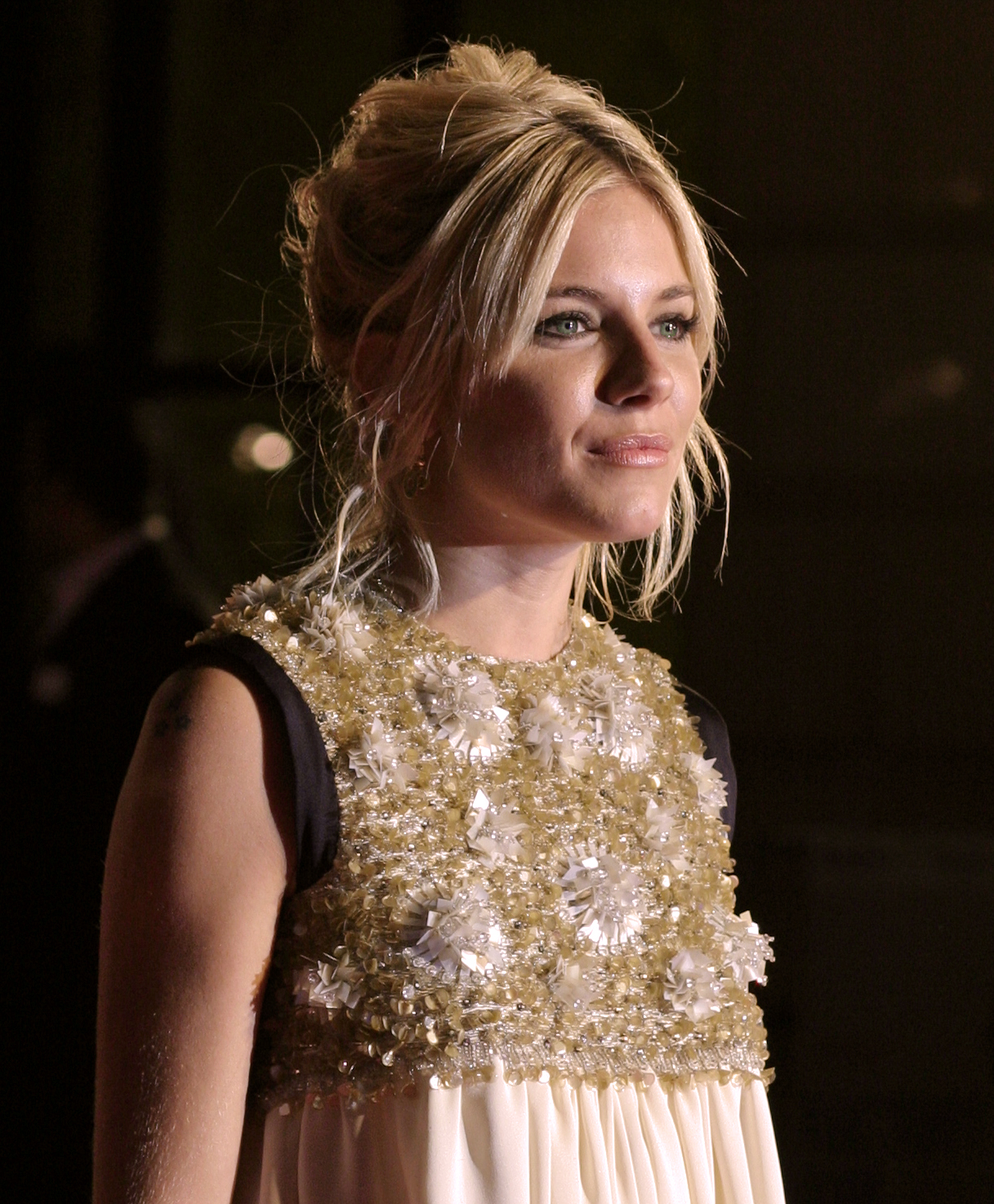
Michelle Williams, Emma Stone, and Sienna Miller each portrayed Sally Bowles in the 2014 Broadway revival.

In September 2013 Roundabout Theatre Company announced plans to return the company's 1998 production to Studio 54 on Broadway in New York. For this revival, Mendes and Marshall reprised their respective roles as director and co-director/choreographer to recreate their work from the earlier production. Cumming starred again as the Emcee while Michelle Williams made her Broadway debut as Sally Bowles. Danny Burstein and Linda Emond played Herr Schultz and Fräulein Schneider. The production began previews on March 21, 2014, with an opening night on April 24, 2014. Emma Stone was a replacement as Sally. Critics praised Stone's performance, describing it "as a flaming flapper, the kind hymned by F. Scott Fitzgerald and embodied by the young Joan Crawford in silent movies." Sienna Miller later took over the role. The production toured the US from January 2016 with Randy Harrison as the Emcee and Andrea Goss (who played Frenchie in the Broadway production). She was replaced by Leigh Ann Larkin.

=== 2021 West End revival ===
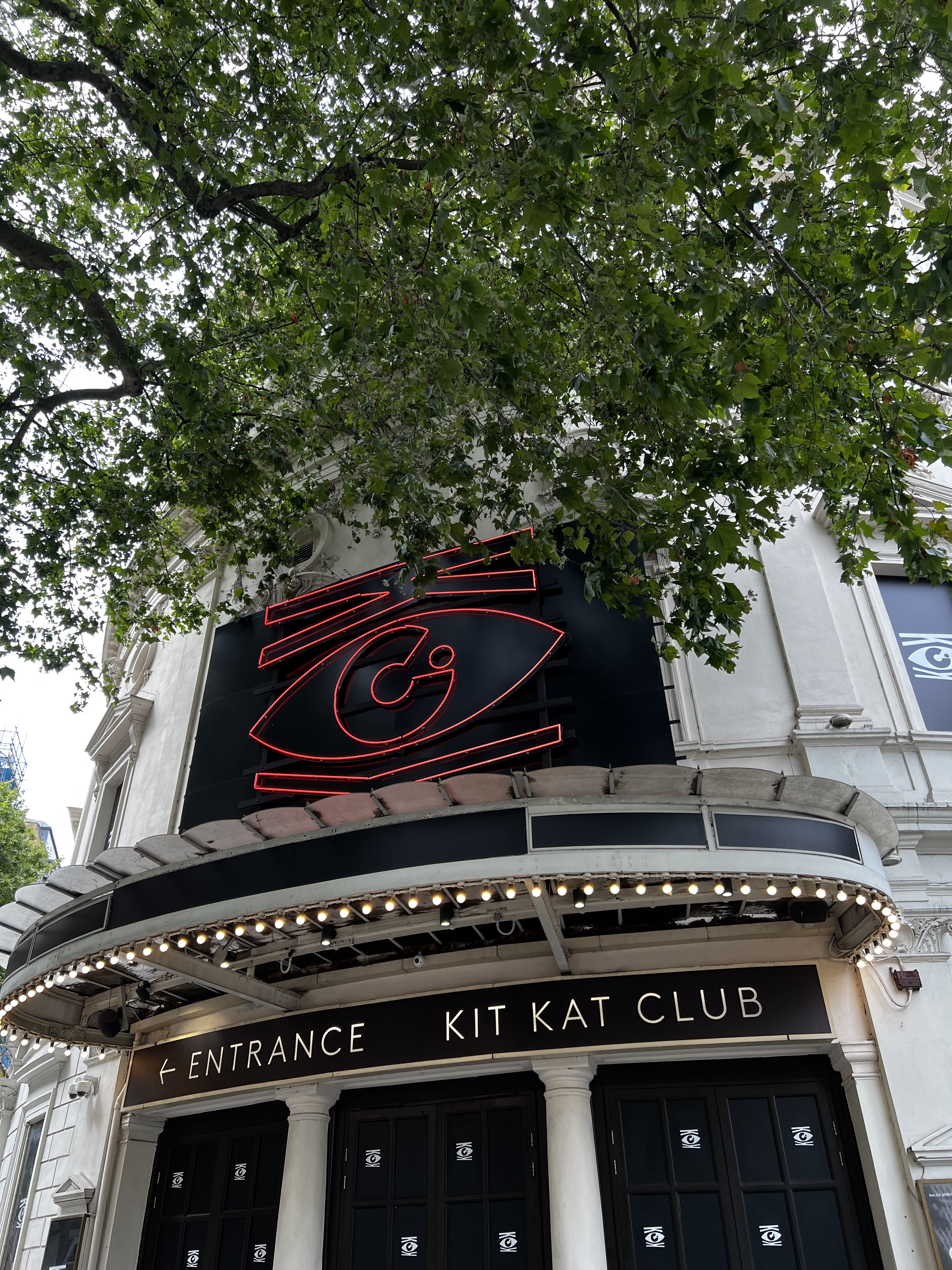
Kit Kat Club (Playhouse Theatre) Marquee in London

Eddie Redmayne and Jessie Buckley starred as the Emcee and Sally Bowles in a West End production directed by Rebecca Frecknall, designed by Tom Scutt, choreographed by Julia Cheng, with lighting design by Isabella Byrd and sound design by Nick Lidster. The production also featured Omari Douglas as Cliff, Liza Sadovy as Fräulein Schneider, Elliot Levey as Herr Schultz, Stewart Clarke as Ernst and Anna-Jane Casey as Fräulein Kost. Produced by Underbelly and Ambassador Theatre Group, and billed as Cabaret at the Kit Kat Club, the production began previews November 15, 2021 at Playhouse Theatre, which was reduced to a 550-seat capacity with an intimate in-the-round stage and table seating for some audience members, in effect transforming the theater into a Weimar-era nightclub. The production led the 2022 Olivier Award nominations with 11 nods, including Best Musical Revival, Best Actor in a Musical for Redmayne and Best Actress in a Musical for Buckley. The production won seven awards and set a record as the most award-winning revival in Olivier history and the first production to receive awards in all four eligible acting categories. It is expected to run until at least September 2027.

Replacement players as the Emcee and Sally Bowles have been Fra Fee and Amy Lennox; Callum Scott Howells and Madeline Brewer; John McCrea and Aimee Lou Wood; Mason Alexander Park and Maude Apatow; Jake Shears and Rebecca Lucy Taylor (aka Self Esteem); Luke Treadaway and Cara Delevingne; Layton Williams and Rhea Norwood; Adam Gillen and Katherine Langford; Billy Porter and Marisha Wallace; Rob Madge and Hannah Dodd; Reeve Carney and Eva Noblezada; Matt Willis and Katie Hall; Jamie Muscato and Joy Woods; and Skylar Astin and Sarah Hyland.

=== 2024 Broadway revival ===
The 2021 West End production transferred to the August Wilson Theatre on Broadway, with previews from April 1, 2024, and the opening on April 21. As in the West End production, the August Wilson Theatre was refurbished as the "Kit Kat Club" with an intimate in-the-round staging. Redmayne reprised his role as the Emcee with Gayle Rankin and Ato Blankson-Wood co-starring as Sally and Cliff. Bebe Neuwirth, Steven Skybell, Natascia Diaz, and Henry Gottfried played Fräulein Schneider, Herr Schultz, Fräulein Kost, and Ernst Ludwig, respectively. The production was nominated for 9 Tony Awards, winning one for scenic design. Replacements in this revival included Adam Lambert, Orville Peck, and Billy Porter as the Emcee and Auliʻi Cravalho, Eva Noblezada, and Marisha Wallace as Sally Bowles. The production closed on September 21, 2025, having played 18 previews and 592 performances.

=== Other productions ===
A BBC Radio 2 radio broadcast in 1996 from the Golders Green Hippodrome starred Clare Burt as Sally Bowles, Steven Berkoff as the Emcee, Alexander Hanson as Clifford Bradshaw, Keith Michell as Herr Schultz, and Rosemary Leach as Fräulein Schneider.

Since 2003, international stagings of the show, many influenced by Mendes' concept, have included productions in Argentina, Australia, Brazil, Colombia, Costa Rica, France, Portugal, Greece, Israel, Malaysia, Mexico, Peru, Puerto Rico, Serbia, South Africa, Spain and Venezuela. A 2008 production at the Stratford Shakespeare Festival's Avon Theatre in Canada, designed by Douglas Paraschuk and directed by Amanda Dehnert, featured Bruce Dow as the Emcee, Trish Lindström as Sally, Sean Arbuckle as Cliff, Nora McClellan as Fräulein Schneider and Frank Moore as Herr Schultz. The Shaw Festival at Niagara-on-the-Lake, Ontario, included Cabaret in its 2014 season. The production, which ran from April 10 – October 26, 2014 at the Festival Theatre, was directed by Peter Hinton-Davis with choreography by Denise Clarke. It featured Juan Chioran as the Emcee, Deborah Hay as Sally, Gray Powell as Cliff, Benedict Campbell as Herr Schultz, and Corrine Koslo as Fräulein Schneider.

A 2017 revival played in Sydney and Melbourne, Australia, starring Paul Capsis as the Emcee and Chelsea Gibb as Sally. The production mixed elements of the Mendes production, such as its version of "Two Ladies" and its portrayal of a gay Cliff, with the colorful art design of the original (the Emcee is in full makeup and clothed) and most of the additional songs from the 1972 film (with the exception of "Mein Herr"). A Dutch production began on October 17, 2026 at DeLaMar Theatre in Amsterdam. It stars Chantal Janzen as Sally. It is set to close on January 3, 2027.

== Cast and characters ==
Character	Original Broadway Cast	Other notable performers in long-running, noteworthy productions
Sally Bowles	Jill Haworth	Judi Dench, Kelly Hunter, Alyson Reed, Jane Horrocks, Natasha Richardson, Anna Maxwell Martin, Michelle Ryan, Michelle Williams, Jessie Buckley, Gayle Rankin, Anita Gillette, Melissa Hart, Susan Egan, Joely Fisher, Lea Thompson, Gina Gershon, Brooke Shields, Molly Ringwald, Jane Leeves, Debbie Gibson, Milena Govich, Jennifer Jason Leigh, Melina Kanakaredes, Teri Hatcher, Kim Medcalf, Amy Nuttall, Emma Stone, Sienna Miller, Amy Lennox, Madeline Brewer, Aimee Lou Wood, Maude Apatow, Rebecca Lucy Taylor, Cara Delevingne, Rhea Norwood, Auli'i Cravalho, Katherine Langford, Marisha Wallace, Eva Noblezada, Hannah Dodd, Katie Hall, Joy Woods, Sarah Hyland
The Emcee	Joel Grey	Barry Dennen, Wayne Sleep, Alan Cumming, James Dreyfus, Will Young, Eddie Redmayne, Michael C. Hall, Norbert Leo Butz, Raúl Esparza, John Stamos, Neil Patrick Harris, Jon Secada, Adam Pascal, Julian Clary, Alistair McGowan, Randy Harrison, Fra Fee, Callum Scott Howells, John McCrea, Mason Alexander Park, Jake Shears, Luke Treadaway, Layton Williams, Adam Lambert, Billy Porter, Orville Peck, Rob Madge, Reeve Carney, Matt Willis, Jamie Muscato, Skylar Astin
Clifford Bradshaw	Bert Convy	Kevin Colson, Peter Land, Gregg Edelman, Adam Godley, John Benjamin Hickey, Michael Hayden, Matt Rawle, Omari Douglas, Ken Kercheval, Larry Kert, Boyd Gaines, Rick Holmes
Fräulein Schneider	Lotte Lenya	Lila Kedrova, Regina Resnik, Sara Kestelman, Mary Louise Wilson, Sheila Hancock, Siân Phillips, Linda Emond, Liza Sadovy, Bebe Neuwirth, Blair Brown, Carole Shelley, Polly Bergen, Alma Cuervo, Mariette Hartley, Honor Blackman, Angela Richards, Ruthie Henshall
Herr Schultz	Jack Gilford	Peter Sallis, Werner Klemperer, Ron Rifkin, Danny Burstein, Elliot Levey, Laurence Luckinbill, Dick Latessa, Hal Linden, Tom Bosley, Tony Roberts, Steven Skybell
Ernst Ludwig	Edward Winter	Denis O'Hare, Martin Moran
Fräulein Kost	Peg Murray	Michele Pawk, Harriet Thorpe, Gayle Rankin, Anna-Jane Casey

== Recordings ==
The first recording of Cabaret was the original Broadway cast album with a number of the songs either truncated (e.g., "Sitting Pretty"/"The Money Song") or outright cut to conserve disk space. When this album was released on compact disc, Kander and Ebb's voice-and-piano recordings of songs cut from the musical were added as bonus material. According to Mandelbaum, the 1968 London cast recording features "a more accurate rendering of the score" and includes the Act One finale "Tomorrow Belongs to Me" reprise, the second-act finale as performed in the theatre, and a number of other previously unrecorded bits and pieces." It was released in the UK and reissued on the CBS Embassy label in 1973.

The 1972 movie soundtrack with Liza Minnelli is much re-written and eliminates all but six of the original songs from the stage production.

Both the 1986 London and 1998 Broadway revival casts were recorded. A 1993 two-CD studio recording contains nearly the entire score, including songs written for the movie and for later productions and much of the incidental music. This recording features Jonathan Pryce as the Emcee, Maria Friedman as Sally, Gregg Edelman as Cliff, Judi Dench as Fräulein Schneider, and Fred Ebb as Herr Schultz. The cast recording of the 2006 London revival at the Lyric Theatre includes James Dreyfus as the Emcee and Anna Maxwell Martin as Sally.

The 2021 London cast album featuring Eddie Redmayne and Jessie Buckley was recorded live at the Playhouse Theatre, London, and released in January 2023. Cabaret: The Maida Vale Session is an EP that was released in March 2024 with four songs from the revival at the Playhouse Theatre, including "Willkommen", "Don't Tell Mama", "I Don't Care Much" and the title song. It was recorded for a BBC Radio 2 show with Jo Whiley at the BBC's Maida Vale Studios with Jake Shears as Emcee, Rebecca Lucy Taylor as Sally and the 2023 London cast and orchestra.

In addition to these recordings, cast albums for French, Spanish, Greek, Hebrew, Italian, Austrian, Dutch, Mexican, and German productions have been released.

== Awards and nominations ==
=== Original Broadway production ===
Year	Award	Category	Nominee	Result
1967	Tony Award	Best Musical		Won
1967	Tony Award	Best Original Score	John Kander and Fred Ebb	Won
1967	Tony Award	Best Actor in a Musical	Jack Gilford	Nominated
1967	Tony Award	Best Actress in a Musical	Lotte Lenya	Nominated
1967	Tony Award	Best Featured Actor in a Musical	Joel Grey	Won
1967	Tony Award	Best Featured Actor in a Musical	Edward Winter	Nominated
1967	Tony Award	Best Featured Actress in a Musical	Peg Murray	Won
1967	Tony Award	Best Direction of a Musical	Harold Prince	Won
1967	Tony Award	Best Choreography	Ron Field	Won
1967	Tony Award	Best Scenic Design	Boris Aronson	Won
1967	Tony Award	Best Costume Design	Patricia Zipprodt	Won
1967	New York Drama Critics' Circle Award	Best Musical		Won
1967	Outer Critics Circle Award	Best Musical		Won

=== 1987 Broadway revival ===
Year	Award	Category	Nominee	Result
1987	Tony Award	Best Revival of a Musical		Nominated
1987	Tony Award	Best Featured Actor in a Musical	Werner Klemperer	Nominated
1987	Tony Award	Best Featured Actress in a Musical	Alyson Reed	Nominated
1987	Tony Award	Best Featured Actress in a Musical	Regina Resnik	Nominated
1987	Drama Desk Award	Outstanding Revival of a Musical		Nominated
1987	Drama Desk Award	Outstanding Actor in a Musical	Joel Grey	Nominated
1987	Drama Desk Award	Outstanding Director of a Musical	Harold Prince	Nominated

=== 1993 London revival ===
Year	Award	Category	Nominee	Result
1994	Laurence Olivier Award	Best Musical Revival		Nominated
1994	Laurence Olivier Award	Best Actor in a Musical	Alan Cumming	Nominated
1994	Laurence Olivier Award	Best Performance in a Supporting Role in a Musical	Sara Kestelman	Won
1994	Laurence Olivier Award	Best Director of a Musical	Sam Mendes	Nominated

=== 1998 Broadway revival ===
Year	Award	Category	Nominee	Result
1998	Tony Award	Best Revival of a Musical		Won
1998	Tony Award	Best Actor in a Musical	Alan Cumming	Won
1998	Tony Award	Best Actress in a Musical	Natasha Richardson	Won
1998	Tony Award	Best Featured Actor in a Musical	Ron Rifkin	Won
1998	Tony Award	Best Featured Actress in a Musical	Mary Louise Wilson	Nominated
1998	Tony Award	Best Direction of a Musical	Sam Mendes and Rob Marshall	Nominated
1998	Tony Award	Best Choreography	Rob Marshall	Nominated
1998	Tony Award	Best Orchestrations	Michael Gibson	Nominated
1998	Tony Award	Best Costume Design	William Ivey Long	Nominated
1998	Tony Award	Best Lighting Design	Peggy Eisenhauer and Mike Baldassari	Nominated
1998	Drama Desk Award	Outstanding Revival of a Musical		Won
1998	Drama Desk Award	Outstanding Actor in a Musical	Alan Cumming	Won
1998	Drama Desk Award	Outstanding Actress in a Musical	Natasha Richardson	Won
1998	Drama Desk Award	Outstanding Featured Actress in a Musical	Michele Pawk	Nominated
1998	Drama Desk Award	Outstanding Director	Sam Mendes and Rob Marshall	Nominated
1998	Drama Desk Award	Outstanding Choreography	Rob Marshall	Nominated
1998	Drama Desk Award	Outstanding Orchestrations	Michael Gibson	Nominated
1998	Drama Desk Award	Outstanding Set Design	Robert Brill	Nominated
1998	Drama Desk Award	Outstanding Costume Design	William Ivey Long	Nominated
1998	Drama Desk Award	Outstanding Lighting Design	Peggy Eisenhauer and Mike Baldassari	Nominated
1998	Drama League Award	Distinguished Production of a Revival		Won
1998	New York Drama Critics' Circle Award	Special Citation		Honored
1998	Outer Critics Circle Award	Outstanding Revival of a Musical		Won
1998	Outer Critics Circle Award	Outstanding Actor in a Musical	Alan Cumming	Won
1998	Outer Critics Circle Award	Outstanding Actress in a Musical	Natasha Richardson	Won
1998	Outer Critics Circle Award	Outstanding Featured Actor in a Musical	Ron Rifkin	Nominated
1998	Outer Critics Circle Award	Outstanding Featured Actress in a Musical	Michele Pawk	Nominated
1998	Outer Critics Circle Award	Outstanding Choreography	Rob Marshall	Nominated
1998	Outer Critics Circle Award	Outstanding Costume Design	William Ivey Long	Nominated
1998	Outer Critics Circle Award	Outstanding Director of a Musical	Sam Mendes and Rob Marshall	Nominated
1998	Outer Critics Circle Award	Outstanding Lighting Design	Peggy Eisenhauer and Mike Baldassari	Nominated
1998	Theatre World Award	Outstanding Broadway Debut	Alan Cumming	Won

=== 2006 West End revival ===
Year	Award	Category	Nominee	Result
2007	Laurence Olivier Award	Best Musical Revival		Nominated
2007	Laurence Olivier Award	Best Performance in a Supporting Role in a Musical	Sheila Hancock	Won
2007	Laurence Olivier Award	Best Theatre Choreographer	Javier de Frutos	Won

=== 2012 West End revival ===
Year	Award	Category	Nominee	Result
2013	Laurence Olivier Award	Best Musical Revival		Nominated
2013	Laurence Olivier Award	Best Actor in a Musical	Will Young	Nominated
2013	Laurence Olivier Award	Best Performance in a Supporting Role in a Musical	Siân Phillips	Nominated

=== 2014 Broadway revival ===
Year	Award	Category	Nominee	Result
2014	Tony Award			
2014	Tony Award	Best Featured Actor in a Musical	Danny Burstein	Nominated
2014	Tony Award	Best Featured Actress in a Musical	Linda Emond	Nominated
2014	Drama Desk Award	Outstanding Featured Actor in a Musical	Danny Burstein	Nominated
2014	Outer Critics Circle Award	Outstanding Revival of a Musical		Nominated
2014	Outer Critics Circle Award	Outstanding Actress in a Musical	Michelle Williams	Nominated
2014	Outer Critics Circle Award	Outstanding Featured Actor in a Musical	Danny Burstein	Nominated
2014	Fred and Adele Astaire Award	Outstanding Choreographer in a Broadway Show	Rob Marshall	Nominated
2014	Fred and Adele Astaire Award	Outstanding Female Dancer in a Broadway Show	Gayle Rankin	Nominated

=== 2021 West End revival ===
Year	Award	Category	Nominee	Result
2022	Laurence Olivier Award	Best Musical Revival		Won
2022	Laurence Olivier Award	Best Actor in a Musical	Eddie Redmayne	Won
2022	Laurence Olivier Award	Best Actress in a Musical	Jessie Buckley	Won
2022	Laurence Olivier Award	Best Actress in a Supporting Role in a Musical	Liza Sadovy	Won
2022	Laurence Olivier Award	Best Actor in a Supporting Role in a Musical	Elliot Levey	Won
2022	Laurence Olivier Award	Best Director	Rebecca Frecknall	Won
2022	Laurence Olivier Award	Best Costume Design	Tom Scutt	Nominated
2022	Laurence Olivier Award	Best Set Design	Tom Scutt	Nominated
2022	Laurence Olivier Award	Best Sound Design	Nick Lidster	Won
2022	Laurence Olivier Award	Best Theatre Choreographer	Julia Cheng	Nominated
2022	Laurence Olivier Award	Best Lighting Design	Isabella Byrd	Nominated
2022	Critics' Circle Theatre Award	Best Actress	Jessie Buckley	Won
2022	Critics' Circle Theatre Award	Best Director	Rebecca Frecknall	Won
2022	Critics' Circle Theatre Award	Best Designer	Tom Scutt	Won

=== 2024 Broadway revival ===
Year	Award	Category	Nominee	Result
2024	Tony Awards	Best Revival of a Musical		Nominated
2024	Tony Awards	Best Actor in a Musical	Eddie Redmayne	Nominated
2024	Tony Awards	Best Actress in a Musical	Gayle Rankin	Nominated
2024	Tony Awards	Best Featured Actor in a Musical	Steven Skybell	Nominated
2024	Tony Awards	Best Featured Actress in a Musical	Bebe Neuwirth	Nominated
2024	Tony Awards	Best Scenic Design in a Musical	Tom Scutt	Won
2024	Tony Awards	Best Costume Design in a Musical	Tom Scutt	Nominated
2024	Tony Awards	Best Lighting Design in a Musical	Isabella Byrd	Nominated
2024	Tony Awards	Best Sound Design in a Musical	Nick Lidster for Autograph	Nominated
2024	Drama Desk Award	Outstanding Revival of a Musical		Nominated
2024	Drama Desk Award	Outstanding Lead Performance in a Musical	Gayle Rankin	Nominated
2024	Drama Desk Award	Outstanding Featured Performance in a Musical	Bebe Neuwirth	Won
2024	Drama Desk Award	Outstanding Direction of a Musical	Rebecca Frecknall	Nominated
2024	Drama Desk Award	Outstanding Sound Design of a Musical	Nick Lidster for Autograph	Won
2024	Outer Critics Circle Award	Outstanding Revival of a Musical		Nominated
2024	Outer Critics Circle Award	Outstanding Featured Performer in a Broadway Musical	Bebe Neuwirth	Nominated
2024	Chita Rivera Awards	Outstanding Choreography in a Broadway Show	Julia Cheng	Nominated
2024	Chita Rivera Awards	Outstanding Ensemble in a Broadway Show		Nominated
2024	Drama League Awards	Outstanding Revival of a Musical		Nominated
2024	Drama League Awards	Distinguished Performance Award	Eddie Redmayne	Nominated
2024	Drama League Awards	Distinguished Performance Award	Gayle Rankin	Nominated
2024	Drama League Awards	Outstanding Direction of a Musical	Rebecca Frecknall	Nominated
2024	Dorian Theater Awards	Outstanding Broadway Musical Revival		Nominated
2024	Dorian Theater Awards	Outstanding Lead Performance in a Broadway Musical	Eddie Redmayne	Nominated
2024	Dorian Theater Awards	Outstanding Featured Performance in a Broadway Musical	Bebe Neuwirth	Nominated
2024	Dorian Theater Awards	Outstanding LGBTQ Broadway Production		Nominated
