= My Life and Lives =

1977 autobiography by Khyongla Rato

- First edition
- Author: Khyongla Rato
- Genre: Autobiography
- Publication date: 1977
- Media type: Print (Paperback)
- ISBN: 0-9630293-0-4

My Life and Lives: Khyongla Rato, The Story of a Tibetan Incarnation is the autobiography of Khyongla Rato Rinpoche, a Tibetan Buddhist scholar and teacher. Rato was an incarnate lama who was born in the Kham district of Tibet in 1923. The introduction to the book was written by the mythologist Joseph Campbell, who also edited the book. My Life and Lives was first published in 1977, and a second edition was published in 1991.

The book focuses primarily on Rato's years in Tibet, before the Tibetan diaspora, which began in 1959. It gives a detailed first-person account of life in Tibet's great monastic universities. The book was awarded Amazon "Best Book of 2014" status.

== Subject ==
Rato recounts that when he was born in 1923 in Ophor, a small village south of Chamdo in the Kham district of Tibet, he was given the name Norbu. At the age of five, Norbu was recognized as a tulku, the 10th incarnation of the lama from the Chung district, i.e. as "Khyongla". At age six he is taken to his labrang, and from there subsequently to Rato Monastery, and in time to Gyudto Tantric College in Lhasa.

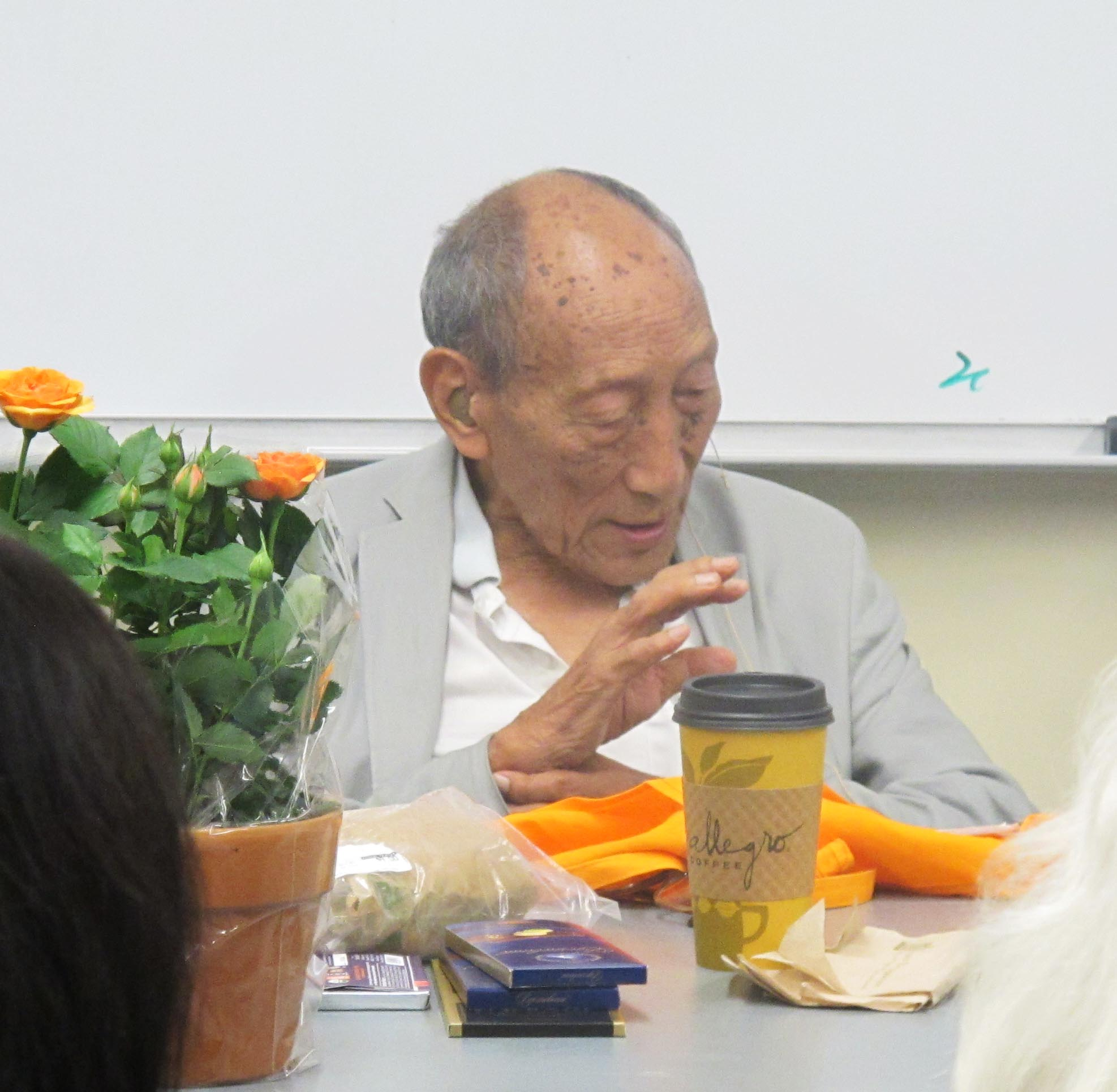
Khyongla Rato Rinpoche teaching on "Om Mani Padme Hum" on September 22nd, 2014, at The Tibet Center, NYC

Then the catastrophic events of the late 1950s are recounted, and Rato leaves Lhasa on the same day that the 14th Dalai Lama secretly leaves to escape into exile over the Himalayas into India.

The last chapter and the epilogue give a brief account of his time in India, and finally his move to New York City, where in 1975, he founded The Tibet Center.

== Reception ==
In the introduction to the book, Joseph Cambell says that when Rato gave him the first chapters to read, it was as if, "...the fabled mysteries of the most secret fastness of forbidden Tibet were, at last, being opened to me by one whose entire life had been given to their interpretation."

Erin Marino on the Columbia University website commented that the book shows that Rato's true nature is "an overwhelming compassion to be of help to others. This character trait shines throughout his autobiography, making for a compelling life story of an incarnate and the Buddhist monastic tradition he took part in."

== See also ==
- The Tibet Center, which Khyongla Rato founded in New York City
- Rato Dratsang, the re-established monastery of which Khyongla Rato is the head lama
- Nicholas Vreeland, also known as Rato Khen Rinpoche or Geshe Thupten Lhundup. A Tibetan Buddhist monk who is the abbot of Rato Dratsang Monastery, a 10th-century Tibetan Buddhist monastery reestablished in India.
