= Buddhist monasticism =

Buddhist community (sangha) principles

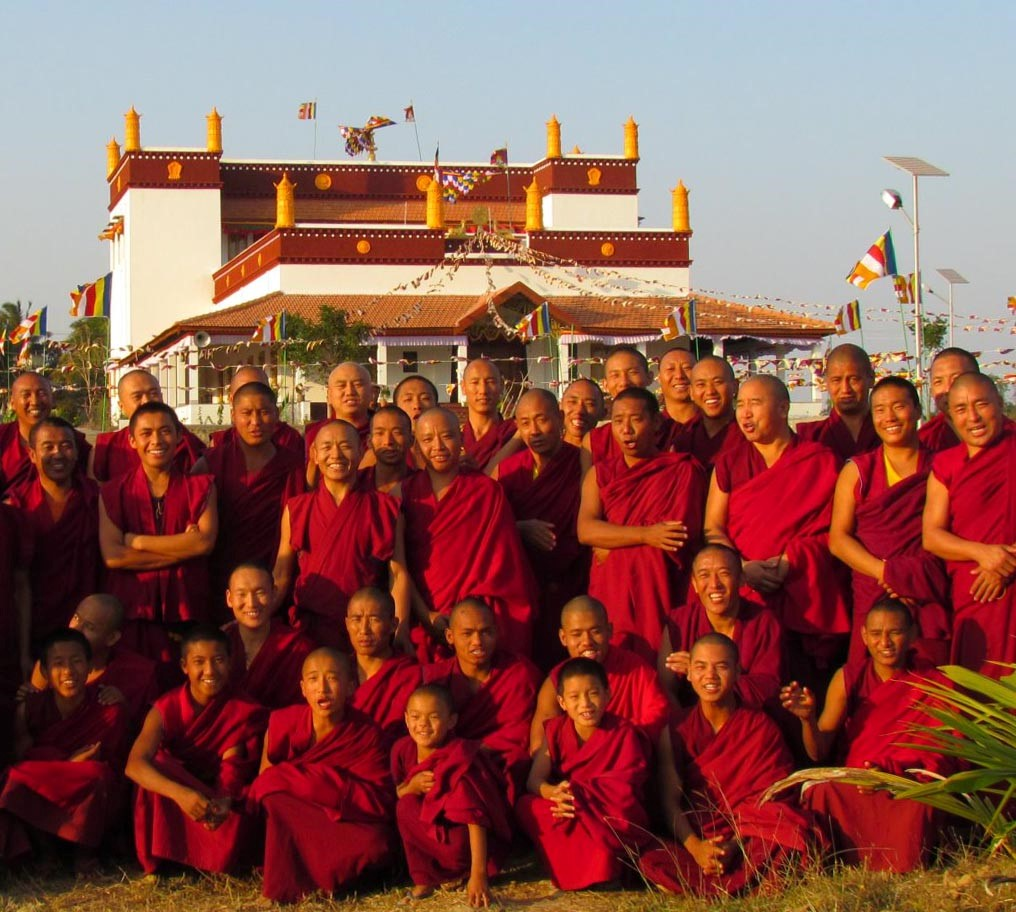
Monks outside the temple at the Tibetan Buddhist monastery, Rato Dratsang, in India, January 2015.

Buddhist monasticism is one of the earliest surviving forms of organized monasticism and one of the fundamental institutions of Buddhism. Monks and nuns, called bhikkhu (Pali, Skt. bhikshu) and bhikkhuni (Skt. bhikshuni), are responsible for the preservation and dissemination of the Buddha's teaching and the guidance of Buddhist lay people. Three surviving traditions of monastic discipline (Vinaya) govern modern monastic life in different regional traditions: Theravada (Sri Lanka and Southeast Asia), Dharmaguptaka (East Asia), and Mulasarvastivada (Tibet and the Himalayan region).

== History and development ==
Buddhism originated as a renunciant tradition, practiced by ascetics who had departed from lay life. According to Buddhist tradition, the order of monks and nuns was founded by Gautama Buddha during his lifetime between the fifth and fourth centuries BCE when he accepted a group of fellow renunciants as his followers. The Buddhist monastic lifestyle grew out of the lifestyle of earlier sects of wandering ascetics, some of whom the Buddha had studied under. This lifestyle was not necessarily isolationist or eremitic: the sangha was dependent on the lay community for basic provisions of food and clothing, and in return sangha members helped guide lay followers on the path of Dharma. Individuals or small groups of monks – a teacher and his students, or several monks who were friends – traveled together, living on the outskirts of local communities and practicing meditation in the forests. Monks and nuns were expected to live with a minimum of possessions, which were to be voluntarily provided by the lay community. Lay followers also provided the daily food that monks required, and provided shelter for monks when they were needed. According to the sutras, during the Buddha's time, retreats and gardens were donated by wealthy citizens for monks and nuns to stay in during the rainy season (although there is as yet no archaeological evidence to support this claim – evidence only exists for such monastic enclosures at a much later date). Out of this tradition grew two kinds of living arrangements for monastics, as detailed in the Mahavagga section of the Vinaya and Varsavastu texts:

1. avāsā: a temporary house for monastics called a vihara. Generally more than one monk stayed in each house with each monk in his own cell, called a parivena.
2. ārāma: a more permanent and more comfortable arrangement than the avasa. This property was generally donated and maintained by a wealthy citizen. This was more lavish (as suggested by the name – Araama means both pleasant and park). It generally consisted of residences within orchards or parks.

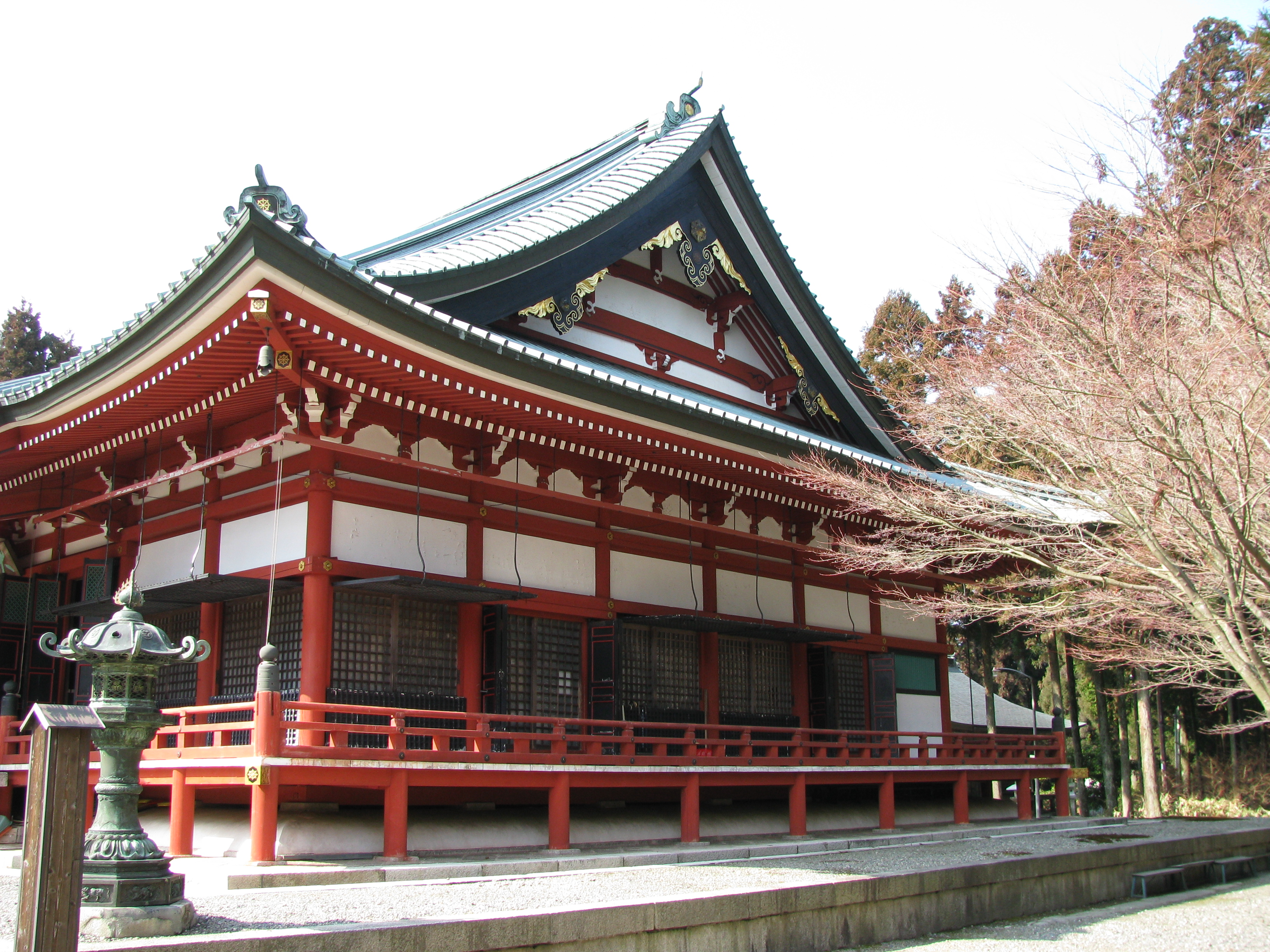
At the peak of its power, Japan's Enryaku-ji was a huge complex of as many as 3,000 sub-temples and a powerful army of warrior monks (僧兵, sōhei).

One of the more famous Arama is Anathapindika's, known as Anathapindikassa arame, built on Prince Jeta's grove. It had buildings worth 1.8 million gold pieces built in a beautiful grove, with the total gift worth 5.4 million gold pieces.

After the parinirvana of the Buddha, the Buddhist monastic order developed into a primarily cenobitic movement. The practice of living communally during the rainy vassa season, prescribed by the Buddha, gradually grew to encompass a settled monastic life centered on life in a community of practitioners. Most of the modern disciplinary rules followed by monks and nuns —the Pratimokṣa— relate to such an existing, prescribing in great detail proper methods for living and relating in a community of monks or nuns.

Monasteries grew considerably after the Buddha's death. Textual and archaeological evidence point to the existence of numerous monasteries in the area around Rajagriha, and the eventual development of large monastic universities in northern India that housed thousands of resident monks.

During the medieval era, the Theravada lineage of bhikkhunis died out. They were eventually replaced by traditions of women ordained as novices, such as the mae ji of Thailand and Dasa sil matavas of Sri Lanka. The medieval era also saw the decline and collapse of organized Buddhist monasticism inside India.

By the time of its disappearance in India, Buddhist monasticism had spread to become a pan-Asian phenomenon, with substantial monastic communities in East and Southeast Asia, and surviving South Asian communities in the Himalayan regions and Tibet. During the 20th Century, Buddhist monasticism expanded abroad in the wake of Western interest in the Buddhist tradition and Asian emigration, resulting in the establishment of Buddhist monasteries in Europe, Australia, Africa, and North and South America.

== Monastic life ==
Buddhism has no central authority, and many different varieties of practice and philosophy have developed over its history. Three surviving Vinaya traditions today govern monastic life in different regions and lineages- the Theravada in Southeast Asia and Sri Lanka, the Dharmaguptaka in East Asia, and the Mulasarvastivada in Tibet and the Himalayan region.

Monks and nuns are expected to fulfill a variety of roles in the Buddhist community. First and foremost, they are expected to preserve the doctrine and discipline now known as Buddhism. They are also expected to provide a living example for the laity, and to serve as a "field of merit" for lay followers, providing laymen and women with the opportunity to earn merit by giving gifts and support to the monks. In return for the support of the laity, monks and nuns are expected to live an austere life focused on the study of Buddhist doctrine, the practice of meditation, and the observance of good moral character. The relative degree of emphasis on meditation or study has often been debated in the Buddhist community. Many continued to keep a relationship with their original families.

=== Bhikkhu and Bhikkhuni assemblies ===
According to the sutras, although his followers initially consisted only of men, the Buddha recognized women as followers after his stepmother, Mahaprajapati, asked for and received permission to live as an ordained practitioner. The Buddha's disciple Ananda strongly insisted on including female order. Female monastic communities in the bhikkhuni lineage were never established in the Vajrayana communities of Tibet and Nepal; Theravada communities formerly existed, but died out between the 11th and 14th century. Ordination in the bhikkhuni lineage continues to exist among East Asian communities, and attempts have been made at a revival in Southeast Asia and Sri Lanka.

Support for bhikkhunis varies substantially between traditions, with mae ji and other Theravada female monastics not receiving the same institutional recognition and support as their fully ordained male counterparts. Women in Theravada countries have also faced official and popular resistance to the re-establishment of fully ordained bhikkhuni lineages.

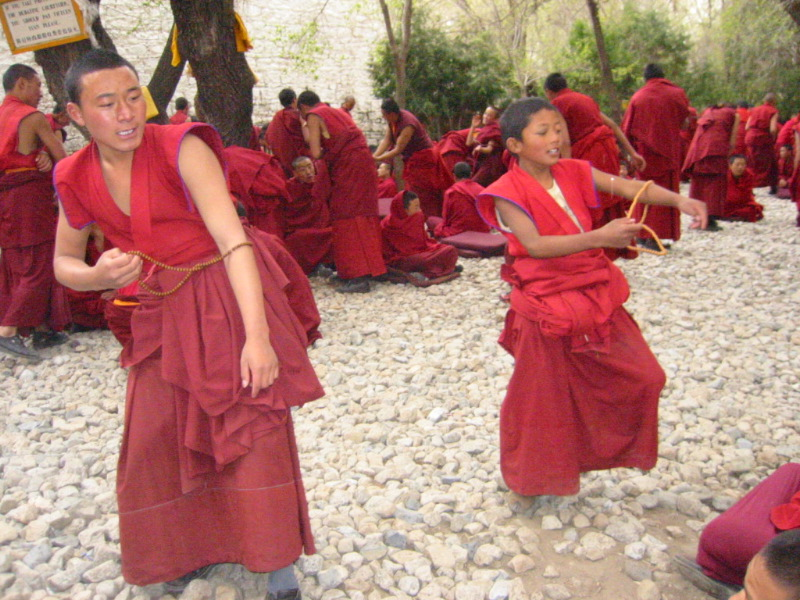
Young Buddhist monks in Tibet practising formal debating

=== Stages of monastic ordination ===
Ordination traditionally is a two-stage process. A Bhikkhu or Bhikkhuni first ordains as a Samanera or Samanerika' (novice), residing in the monastery and learning about monastic life. They may then undergo upasampada, higher ordination, which confers full monastic status and obligations.

Male novices may ordain at a very young age in the Theravada tradition, but generally no younger than 8- traditional guidelines state that a child must be "old enough to scare away crows". In the East Asian tradition, formal samanera ordination can not occur until the age of nineteen, though prospective novices can live in the monastic community from a very young age. Women usually choose to ordain as adults, since there is no expectation that they do so in childhood. Samaneras live according to the Ten Precepts, but are not responsible for living by the full set of monastic rules.

There are no requirements for the length of ordination as a samanera. In Southeast Asia, novitiates may be as short as a few weeks, and temporary ordination for a period of weeks or months is common.

Higher ordination(upasampada), conferring the status of a full Bhikkhu or Bhikkhuni, is given to those 20 or older. Women monastics follow a similar progression, but are required to live as Samaneras for a longer period of time, typically five years. Higher ordination must take place before a quorum of monastics, with five being an allowable minimum, and ten suggested for ordinary circumstances.

Those who have undergone higher ordination are required to follow a large number of additional rules, known as the Pratimokṣa, that govern their behavior, dress, and decorum. The number of rules varies between Vinaya traditions, with Theravada monks observing approximately 258 rules, Dharmaguptaka monks 250, and Mulasarvastivada monks 258. Nuns must observe additional rules, some of which formally subordinate them to male monastics. Theravada nuns have 311 rules, Dharmaguptaka nuns 348, and Mulasarvastivada nuns 354.

Regional traditions differ as to whether higher ordination is a permanent change in status (barring violations of the monastic rules), or if ordination vows can be temporarily or permanently rescinded. In Burma, Taiwan and Hong Kong, there is sometimes short term monastic ordination available to lay Buddhists to take some vows for a week up to a month. In Thailand such arrangements are currently available for males only.

Customs regarding other aspects of higher ordination also vary between countries. While most career monastics in the Theravada tradition undertake formal upasampada ordination as soon as they are eligible, monks in East Asia often remain novices. This may be due to a historical shortage of fully qualified temples able to provide upasampada ordination in East Asian communities. East Asian monastics also typically undertake Bodhisattva Precepts, a set of additional guidelines based on the Bodhisattva path.

Early differences in the interpretation or ordination practices and monastic rules, combined with geographical differences, may have resulted in the development of the various early Buddhist schools out of ordination lineages known as Nikayas.

=== Rules and precepts ===
The disciplinary regulations for monks and nuns are intended to create a life that is simple and focused, rather than one of deprivation or severe asceticism.

==== Celibacy ====
Celibacy (brahmacariya) is a foundational discipline for monastics and is universal across all Buddhist traditions. The renunciation of sex, marriage, and reproduction is seen as the preeminent factor in separating the life of a monastic from that of a householder (non-monastic). Because celibacy is fundamental to monastic culture, the persecution of Buddhists has frequently involved forcing monastics to abandon celibacy and marry in order to assimilate them into lay society (laicization). Anticelibacy and pronatalist policies targeting Buddhist monastics existed in the Empire of Japan and in Tibet under Chinese rule.

==== Diet ====
Depending on the tradition and the strictness of observance, monastics may eat only one meal a day, provided either through direct donations of food from lay supporters or from a monastery kitchen stocked (and possibly staffed) by lay supporters. Vegetarianism is considered ideal and encouraged in Buddhism, but it is not necessarily mandatory, as the Vinaya explicitly allows monks and nuns to eat meat.

==== Hierarchy ====
Unlike Christian monastics, some schools of Buddhist monastics are not required to live a life of obedience to a superior. However, it is expected that monastics will offer respect to senior members of the Sangha (in Thai tradition, seniority is based on the number of rains retreats, vassas, that one has been ordained). The Buddha did not appoint a successor, nor did he specify rules mandating obedience in the monastic code. Individual groups of monastics are expected to make decisions collectively through regular gatherings of the community, at which decisions regarding violations of monastic rules and the dispositions of communal property are to be made. Individual relationships of teacher/student, senior/junior, and preceptor/trainee may be observed among groups of monastics, but there are no formal positions, nor is there any authority to give orders or commands invested in senior monks. An abbess or abbot, typically a senior monastic still young enough to be active, is usually responsible for the day-to-day administration of the monastery, and may appoint others to assist with the work. In some traditions, the abbess/abbot is chosen by a vote of the monastics in a monastery. In other traditions (Thailand, for example), the abbot is chosen by the lay community.

== Local variations ==
Monastic practices vary significantly according to location. In part, this can be attributed to differences in the scriptural and doctrinal traditions that were received in different parts of the Buddhist world. Additionally, local concessions to social, geographical, and climatic conditions have been adopted by most monastic orders in order to smooth the integration of monks into local communities, and to ensure that monks live in a safe and reasonable manner. In cold climates, for instance, monks are permitted to own and wear additional clothing not specified in the scriptures. In areas where begging rounds are impossible (due to traffic, geography, or disfavor by the lay community), monks more commonly employ a kitchen staff of monks or lay followers who are responsible for providing meals for the community. For instance, in the Theravada tradition monks continue to follow the traditional practice of asking for alms where possible. In East Asia, Confucian views discouraged begging and lead to many monasteries growing their own food and employing monks as cooks.

Although there were a number of distinct vinaya traditions or ordination lineages, only three have survived to the present day: the Theravāda, Dharmaguptaka, and Mūlasarvāstivāda.

=== Tibet ===
While Tibetan Buddhism generally adheres to a Mahāyāna tradition that values vegetarianism, many Tibetan monks eat meat due to the harsh climatic conditions of the Tibetan Plateau, which make a plant-based diet difficult. This practice is consistent with allowances in the Vinaya, which permit monks to consume meat under certain conditions.

Before the annexation of Tibet by the People's Republic of China, a significant portion of the country’s male population was ordained. Today, this is no longer the case. Following the 1959 Tibetan uprising, Chinese authorities forced thousands of monks to abandon the monastic life and become "ordinary" citizens by marrying. The forced laicization of monastics occurred again during the Cultural Revolution, and those who resisted were imprisoned. Prisoners were forced to perform hard labor, tortured and executed. Celibacy is a fundamental requirement for monks and nuns in all sects of Buddhism, and monastics may marry only if they renounce their vows and return to lay life.

In the Gelug school, monastic discipline is heavily emphasized, and the Dalai Lama and Panchen Lama are always monks. The heads of the Kagyu school lineages are also usually monks. However, in some schools of Tibetan Buddhism, there are some important clerical roles filled by lay practitioners who are allowed to marry. The Nyingma school has no central authority, and includes a mixture of celibate monks and non-celibate ngakpas. Ngakpas are expected to follow practices that differ significantly from those of monks, such as living in households rather than monasteries and wearing their hair long instead of shaving it. In the Sakya school, the Sakya Trizin is a lay tantric and can never be a monk, as leadership is passed down through a hereditary patriarchal system among male members of the Khön family.

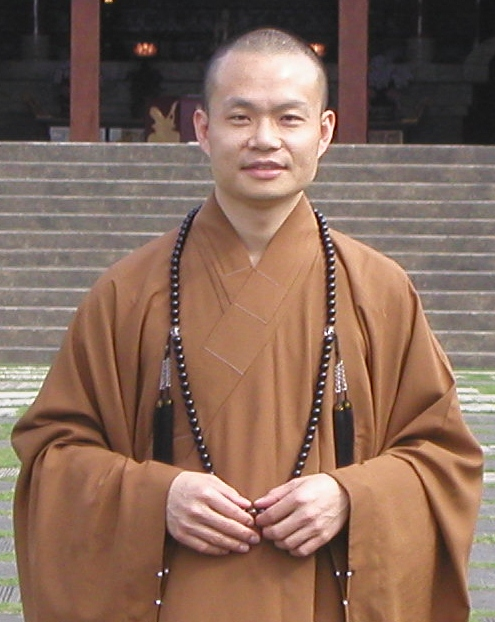
A Buddhist monk in Kaohsiung, Taiwan, wearing the robes of an abbot in a monastery

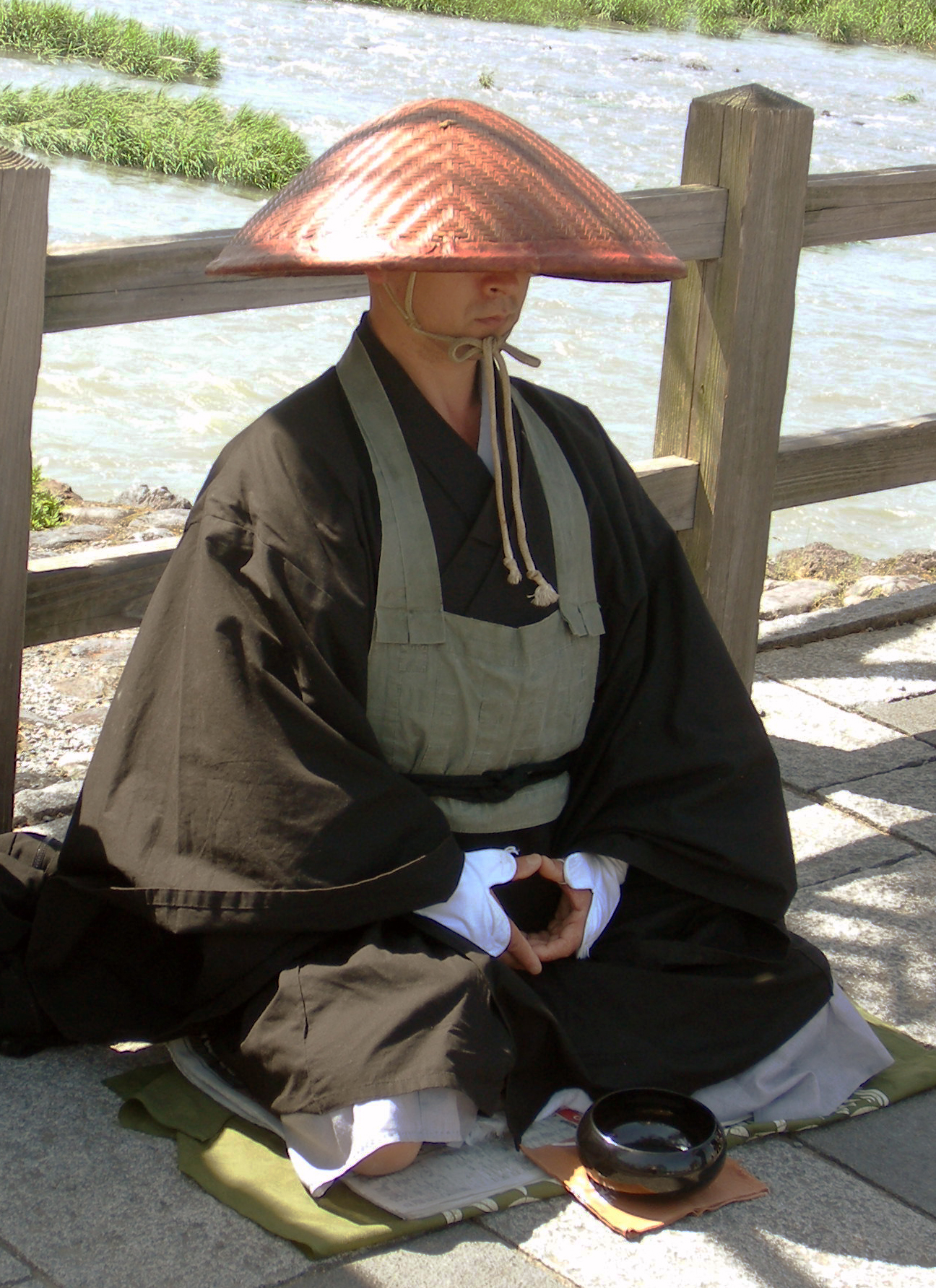
A mendicant monk in Kyoto, Japan

=== East Asia ===
In East Asia, monastics live in greater isolation from the lay population than is observed in most Theravada countries. Because of local conditions of geography and climate, as well as local attitudes towards begging, monks generally do not make begging rounds in China, Korea, Vietnam, and many parts of Japan. Instead, monasteries receive donations of bulk food (such as rice) and funds for the purchase of food that is then stored and prepared at the monastery. Many monks and nuns are vegetarians and, after Baizhang Huaihai, many monks farm food to eat; some work or sell. Most eat after noon. The management of the kitchen and monastery properties may be the purview of a specially designated layman or a monk who has been given a special role by the abbot of the monastery. Monks chant many mantras in regular living. Buddhist monks and nuns lived together in China in Lingshansi (河南信阳灵山寺), Luming'an (河南固始九华山妙高寺鹿鸣庵), Hong'ensi (重庆鸿恩寺), Ciyunsi (重庆慈云寺), Sandingsi (西藏山南桑丁寺).

==== Japan ====
Japanese Buddhism is uniquely distinguished by its rejection of celibate monasticism and the absence of ordination under the Vinaya. Monks (bhikkhu) and nuns (bhikkhuni) do not exist in Japanese Buddhism, having been entirely replaced by ordained lay clergy. In some Asian countries, an adage criticizing the lack of a true monastic community in Japanese Buddhism is, "Buddhist temples do exist, but there are no Buddhist monks."

Saichō, the founder of the Tendai school, preferred ordaining clergy under the Bodhisattva vows rather than the Vinaya. The Bodhisattva vows gradually spread throughout Japanese Buddhism and replaced the Vinaya, but the vows still maintained celibacy as essential to monasticism. The origin of non-celibate monasticism in Japan can be traced to Jōdo Shinshū, which allowed priests and priestesses to marry, influenced by the sect's founder, Shinran.

The Vinaya lineage became extinct in Japan after being replaced by the Boddhisattva vows, making it impossible to ordain new monks. Since the Vinaya is fundamental to the ordination of Buddhist monastics, Japanese Buddhist clergy cannot be regarded as monks (bhikkhu) or nuns (bhikkhunī), but rather constitute a distinct class of lay clergy and temple administrators. In Japan, non-celibate clergy are commonly referred to as sōryo (僧侶) and are regarded as distinct from bhikkhu, known in Japanese as biku (比丘). While they are often labeled “monks” and “nuns” in English, some consider this terminology misleading and offensive, as it conflates lay Buddhist clergy with fully ordained bhikkhu and bhikkhunī. In English, non-celibate Buddhist clergy are more accurately referred to as “priests” and “priestesses”.

However, the practice of non-celibate monasticism was never widespread outside of Jōdo Shinshū until the Imperial Japanese government enacted the Nikujiku Saitai Law (肉食妻帯) during the Meiji Restoration. Through the lens of Japanese nationalism, Buddhism came to be viewed as a suspicious and foreign religion associated with China. In an effort to secularize the Buddhist clergy and promote the newly established religion of State Shinto, it was declared that clergy of any Buddhist sect were free to marry. Japanese Buddhist clergy were also permitted to drink alcohol, eat meat, and raise children in so-called “family temples”. This movement, known as the Haibutsu kishaku of the Meiji era, resulted in the destruction of tens of thousands of Buddhist temples across Japan, the forced laicization of Buddhist clergy, widespread attacks on Buddhist doctrine and praxis, and other repressive anti-Buddhist measures.

The spread of non-celibate monasticism across the Japanese colonial empire was part of Imperial Japan's systematic efforts to eradicate the cultures of its colonial territories. Japanese Buddhist missionaries in colonial Korea declared that Korean Buddhism needed to be reformed under their guidance, and traditional Korean Buddhist practices were replaced with Japanese ones in an effort to assimilate Koreans into Japanese society. Monks from pro-Japanese factions began adopting Japanese customs, including marriage, having children, and living with their families in monasteries. In 1970, the Korean Seon community split over this issue: the larger Jogye Order remains fully celibate, while the smaller Taego Order retains non-celibate priests as a remnant of Japanese colonialism.

The Empire of Japan also strategically employed sexual violence against Buddhist monastics in China as a form of psychological warfare to weaken Chinese religious institutions and resistance to Japanese imperialism. Because Buddhist monastics take vows of celibacy, Japanese soldiers raped Buddhist nuns and forced monks to rape women during the Nanjing Massacre in an effort to spiritually violate them.

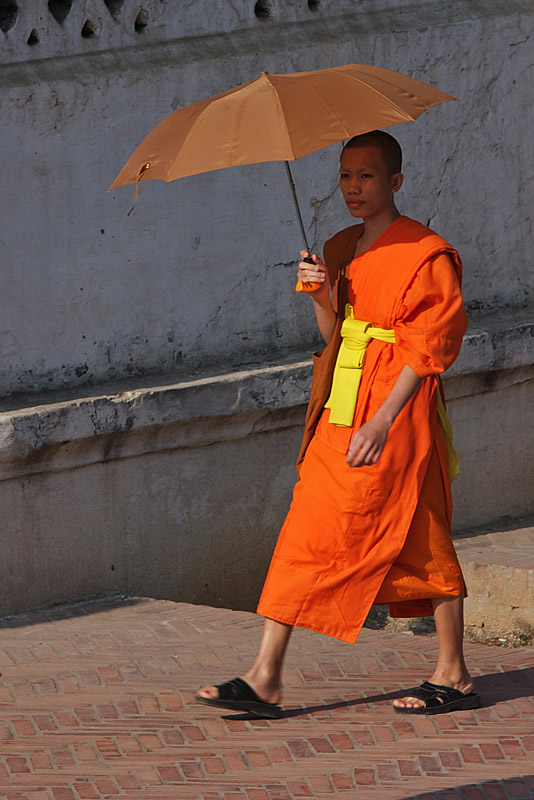
Young Buddhist monk in the streets of Luang Prabang, Laos

=== Southeast Asia ===
In Sri Lanka, Thailand, Cambodia, Laos, and Myanmar, where the Theravada school is dominant, there is a long tradition of temporary ordination. During a school break, many young men usually ordain for a week or two to earn merit for loved ones and to gain knowledge of Buddhist teachings. In most countries, this temporary ordination occurs during the vassa retreat, which is regarded as a period of intensified spiritual effort by local Buddhists. Men in Thailand typically temporarily ordain only before being married; men in Laos and Myanmar could traditionally return to the monastery from time to time after being married, provided that they secured their wives' permission. As is the case with all other forms of Buddhism, a man who is fully ordained and becomes a monk must be celibate.

Theravada monks are also most likely to engage in traditional practices of collecting alms, although the urbanization of parts of Southeast Asian (particularly Thailand) has presented a challenge to this practice.

== See also ==
- Abbot (Buddhism)
- Bhikkhu
- Bhikkhunī
- Buddhist ethics
- Greco-Buddhist monasticism
- Monasticism
- Sangha
- Theragatha, Verses of the Elder Monks
- Therigatha, Verses of the Elder Nuns
- Upasampadā
- Vihāra
