= An Open Heart =

An Open Heart may refer to:

- An Open Heart (book), a 2002 book by the Dalai Lama Tenzin Gyatso and Nicholas Vreeland
- An Open Heart (film), a 2012 French drama film

== See also ==
- Open heart (disambiguation)
