= Monk with a Camera =

2014 US documentary on Nicholas Vreeland

- Film poster
- Directed by: Guido Santi; Tina Mascara
- Produced by: Guido Santi; Tina Mascara; Vishwanath Alluri
- Cinematography: Ugo Lo Pinto; Ralph Q. Smith
- Edited by: Guido Santi; Tina Mascara
- Music by: Pivio and Aldo De Scalzi
- Release date: November 21, 2014
- Running time: 90 minutes
- Country: United States
- Language: English

Monk with a Camera: The Life and Journey of Nicholas Vreeland is a 2014 American feature-length documentary film directed by Guido Santi and Tina Mascara. The subject of this biographical film is Nicholas Vreeland, an American who is a Tibetan Buddhist monk, and also a photographer. He is the first westerner to be made abbot of a major Tibetan government monastery.

The film features the 14th Dalai Lama, Vreeland's teacher Khyongla Rato Rinpoche, the actor Richard Gere, John Avedon (who is Richard Avedon's son), Vreeland's father Frederick Vreeland, his brother Alexander Vreeland, and his half-brother Ptolemy Tompkins.

The film briefly shows The Tibet Center, the Tibetan Buddhist center in New York City which was founded by Khyongla Rato, and where both he and Vreeland teach, as well as the Tibet Center's retreat home in New Jersey. Also shown, in some detail, is Rato Dratsang Monastery, Vreeland's home for most of his adult life: a reestablished Tibetan monastery within the Tibetan settlement in Karnataka state in India.

== Subject ==
Nicholas Vreeland grew up in a life of privilege and wealth, being the son of Frederick Vreeland, a notable diplomat, and the grandson of Diana Vreeland, the famous fashion editor. However, as a young man, Vreeland left that life to become a monk in Rato Monastery in India.

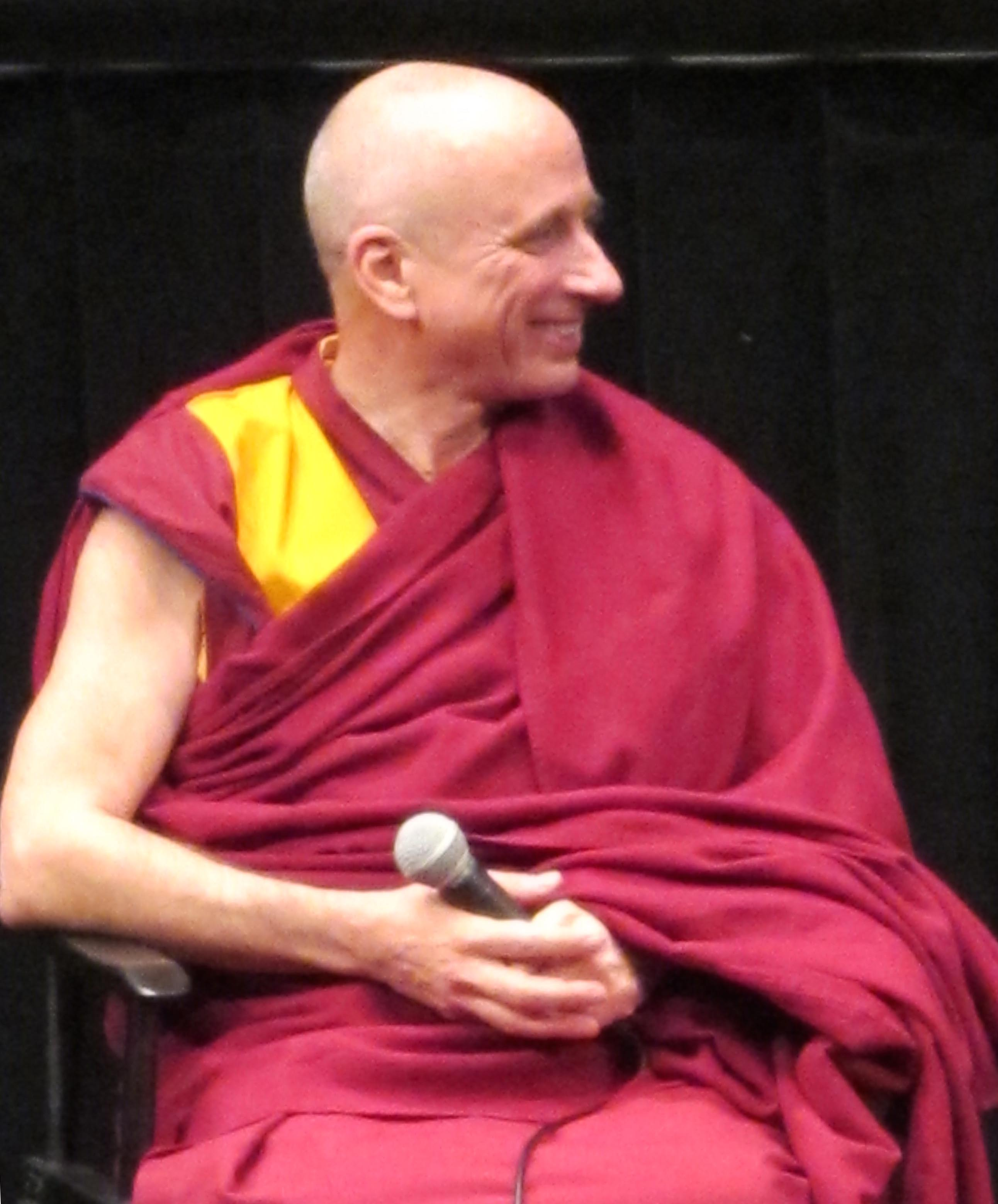
Geshe Nicholas Vreeland at Lincoln Center during the New York premiere of the film

During his years as a monk, Vreeland struggles with his relationship with the camera, finding it almost impossible to give up being a photographer, but worrying that his attachment to photography as an artistic pursuit might compromise his dedication to the spiritual path.

When funding for the rebuilding of the monastery was cancelled due to the Great Recession, out of necessity Vreeland's abilities as a photographer became the means to raise the funds needed to complete the building project.

In 2012 the Dalai Lama appoints Vreeland as the abbot of the monastery.

The film uses archival photographs and film sequences, animated sequences, interviews, and numerous on-location segments filmed in India, in New Jersey, in New York City, in Los Angeles, and other major cities worldwide. The cameras used include a Leica M4, Leica M6 both with a 35mm f/2 Summicron lens and a Fujifilm X100S.

At various points in the film, as well as photographs taken by Vreeland himself, we see him looking at photographs of his family taken by Irving Penn, Richard Avedon, and Cecil Beaton. We also see Vreeland reading Tintin in Tibet, by the Belgian cartoonist Hergé. This was a book he enjoyed as a child; it was his first introduction to Tibetan Buddhism.

== The directors ==
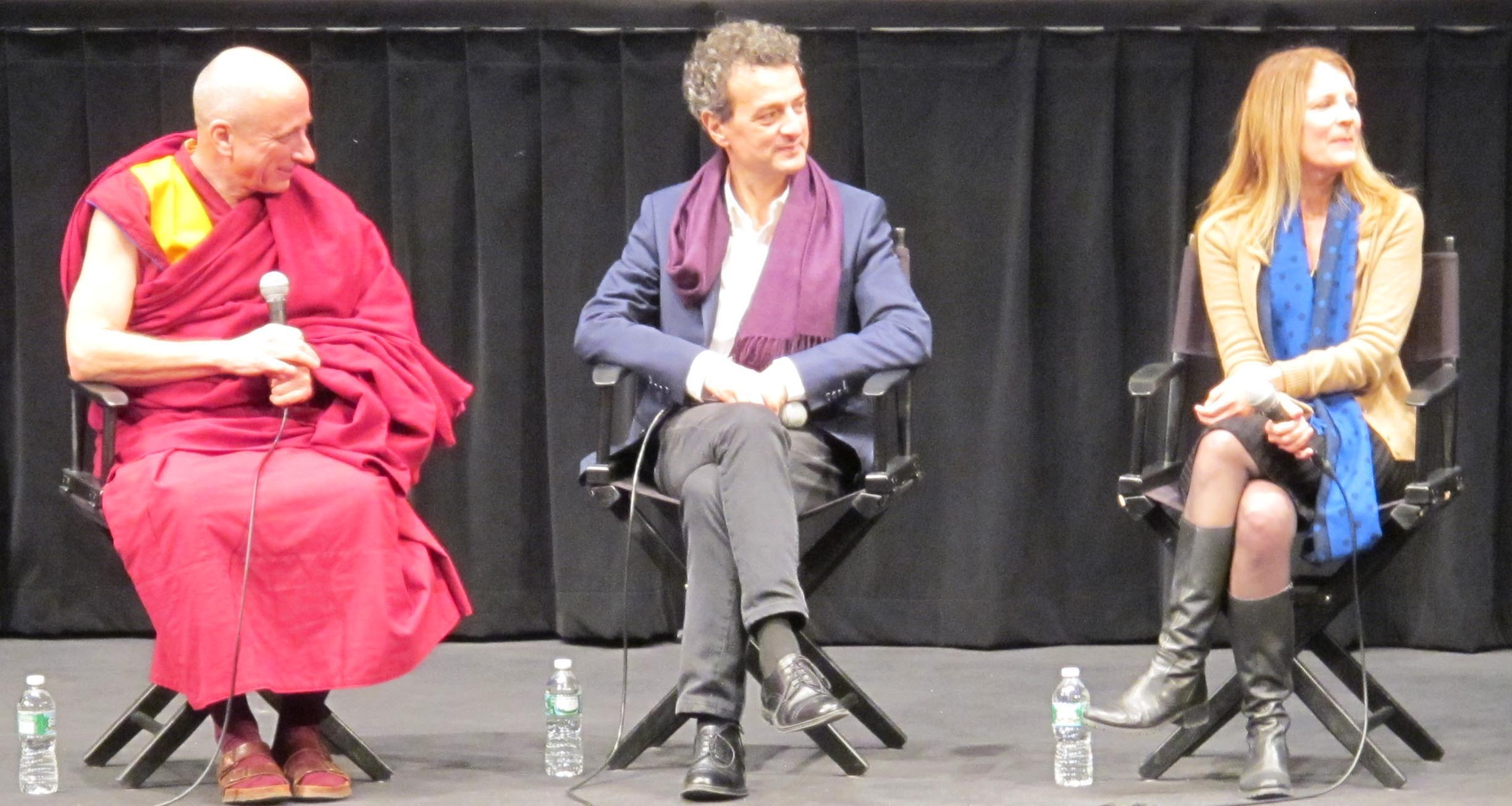
Nicholas Vreeland, Guido Santi and Tina Mascara at Lincoln Center

Guido Santi and Tina Mascara, the directors of Monk with a Camera, were previously best known for their 2007 documentary, the critically acclaimed Chris & Don: A Love Story, about the life-long relationship between the British writer, Christopher Isherwood and the American painter, Don Bachardy.

== Reception ==
The New York premiere was on November 21, 2014, at the Walter Reade Theater at Film Society of Lincoln Center in Lincoln Center, Manhattan.

Many reviews were positive. Diana Clarke of the Village Voice called the film "marvelous" and said, "Nicholas Vreeland has a shaved head and a famous last name. The first, obvious and gleaming, advertises his humility and his life as a Tibetan Buddhist monk. The second, subtle and refined, suggests just how hard that humility was to come by."

Godfrey Cheshire on the website RogerEbert.com commented that the film's portrait of Vreeland suggests, "an inner odyssey as extraordinary as any journey across continents, mountain ranges and time zones".

David Noh of Film Journal International called Monk with a Camera an "enthralling and uplifting documentary".

In a review for Variety, Dennis Harvey said the film has an "attractive mix of retro celebrity and spiritual appeal".

However, Ben Kenigsberg in The New York Times was less positive, saying that the film "plays like a fashion shoot with robes".

Monk with a Camera was shown in Los Angeles starting on December 12, 2014, at the Laemmle Royal, and after that was shown in other cinemas nationwide.
