= The Tibet Center =

Dharma center in New York City, New York

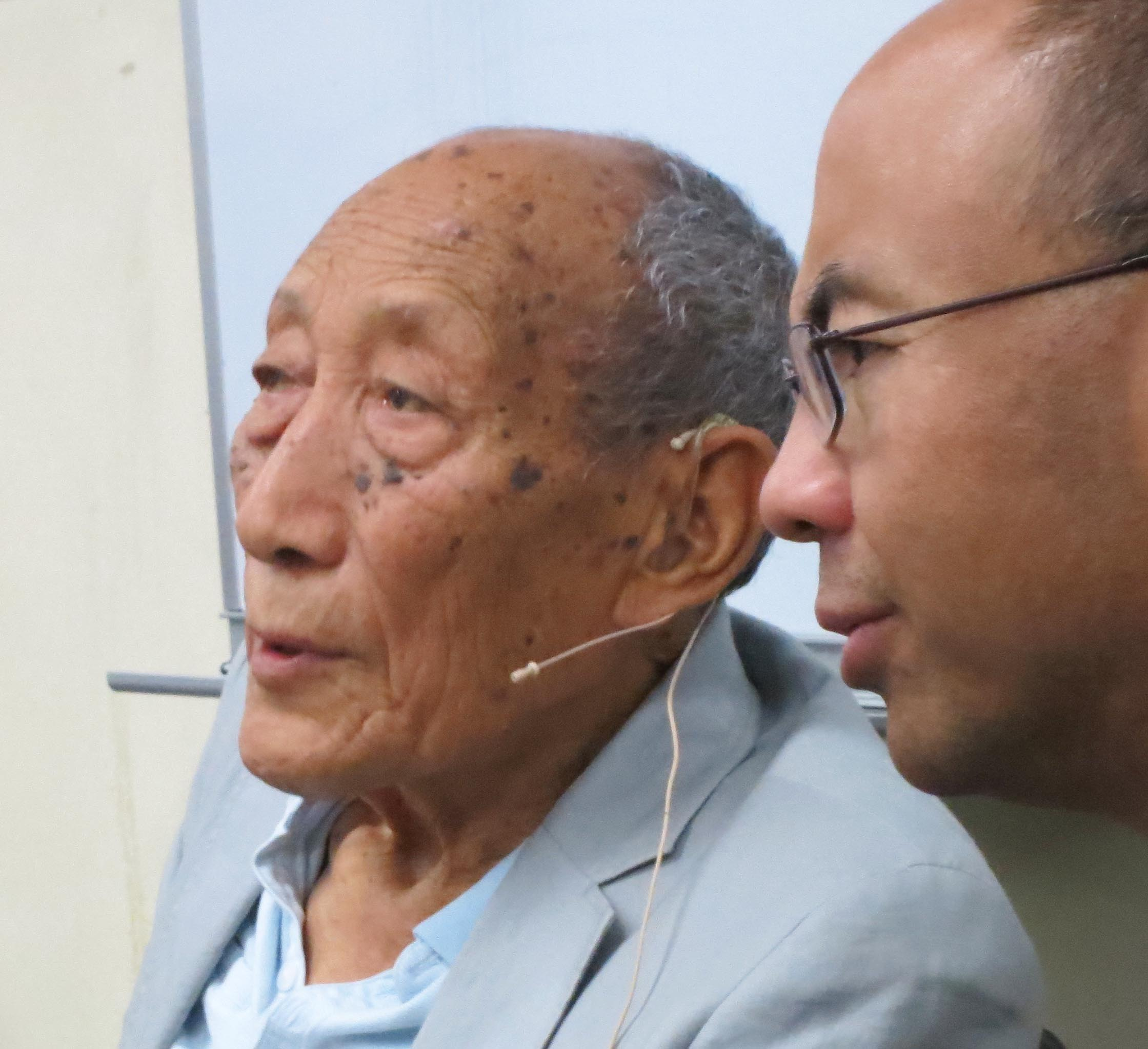
Khyongla Rato Rinpoche teaching at The Tibet Center in September 2014 with translator, Tenzin Gelek, on the right.

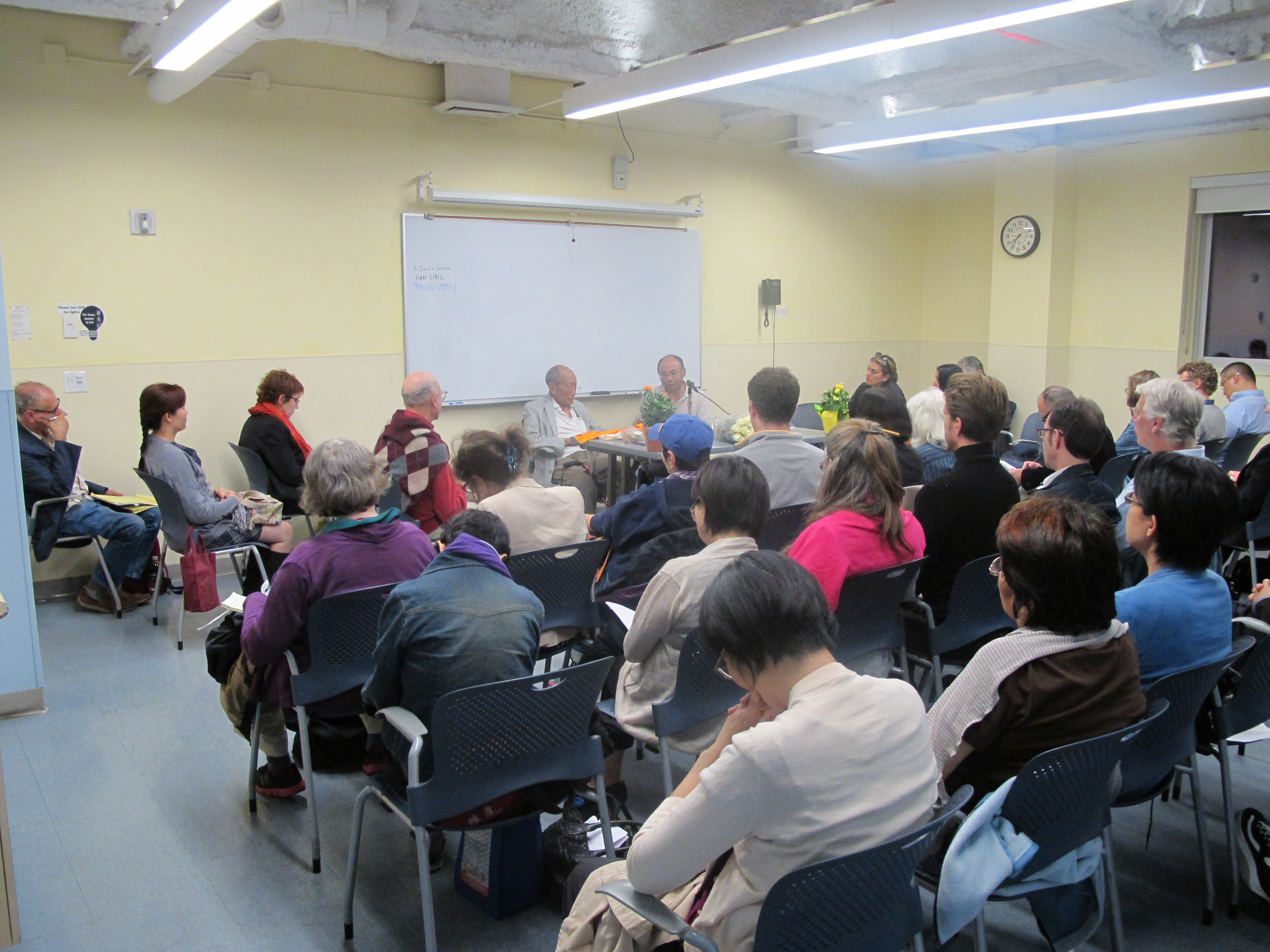
Tibet Center meeting with Khyongla Rato Rinpoche teaching

The Tibet Center, also known as Kunkhyab Thardo Ling, is a dharma center for the study of Tibetan Buddhism. Founded by Venerable Khyongla Rato Rinpoche in 1975, it is one of the oldest Tibetan Buddhist centers in New York City. The current director is Khen Rinpoche Nicholas Vreeland, the abbot of Rato Dratsang monastery. Philip Glass assisted with the founding of The Tibet Center. Since 1991 TTC has invited and hosted the 14th Dalai Lama for teaching events in New York in partnership with the Gere Foundation.

== Name ==
Kunkhyab Thardo Ling (translation: Land Pervaded with Seekers of Liberation), is a Tibetan dharma name given to the center by the 6th Ling Rinpoche, the 97th Gaden Tripa, the senior tutor of the Dalai Lama and a teacher of Khyongla Rato Rinpoche.

== Tibet Center teachers ==
The Tibet Center has three main teachers: the founder Venerable Khyongla Rato Rinpoche (1923-2022), a Tibetan incarnate lama, Venerable Khen Rinpoche, Geshe Nicholas Vreeland, and Anthony Spina, another long time student of Khyongla Rinpoche.

Many teachers have taught at The Tibet Center, including Venerable Kyabje Ling Rinpoche, Venerable Tsenshab Serkong Rinpoche, the official debating partner of the Dalai Lama, Sakya Trizin Rinpoche, the hereditary head of the Sakya order of Tibetan Buddhism, Venerable Trulshik Rinpoche of the Nyingma tradition, Venerable Tenga Rinpoche of the Kagyu tradition, and the 7th Ling Rinpoche. Teachers from the Buddhist Chan, Theravadan and Zen traditions, and from the Jain, Hindu and Christian religions, as well as scientists and philosophers, have also taught at TTC.

=== Khyongla Rato ===
Khyongla Rinpoche, a tulku born in Kham, Tibet in 1923, taught at TTC for over 40 years. He left Tibet in 1959 and lived in New York, and subsequently New Jersey, starting in 1968. He had a role in the film Little Buddha at the Dalai Lama's request.

=== Geshe Nicholas Vreeland, Khen Rinpoche ===
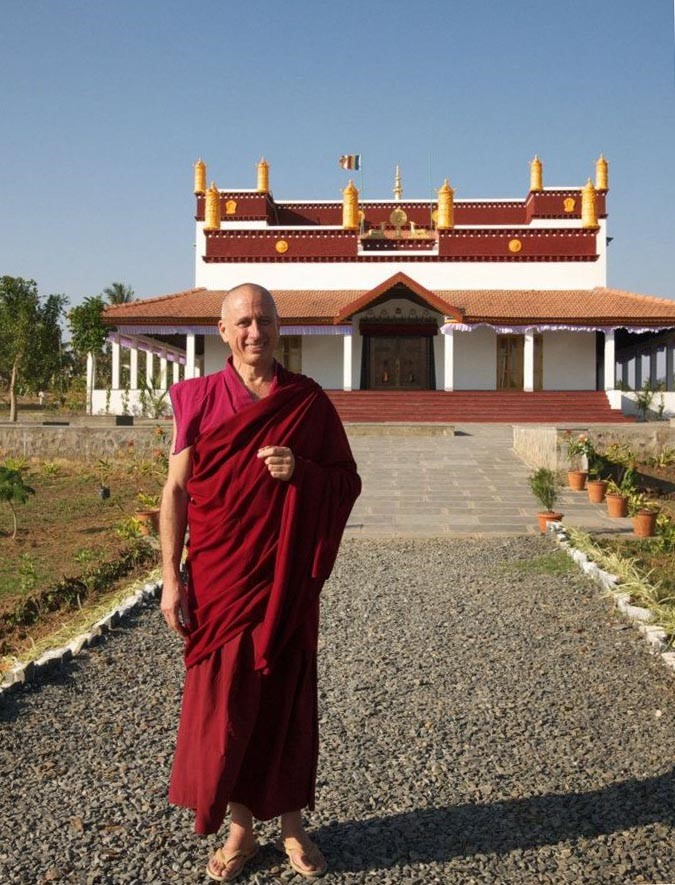
Khen Rinpoche Nicholas Vreeland in front of the temple at Rato Dratsang, January 2015

Geshe Nicholas Vreeland, Khen Rinpoche, current director of The Tibet Center, is the first westerner to be made abbot of a Tibetan Buddhist monastery, Rato Dratsang, which was re-established in Karnataka, India. He is a fully ordained monk and holds a Ser Tri Geshe Degree from Rato Monastery. A photographer, the grandson of Diana Vreeland, he is the subject of the biographical documentary film, Monk with a Camera.

== Dalai Lama events ==
Since 1979, the Tibet Center, primarily in partnership with the Gere Foundation, and with Tibet House US, has been instrumental in inviting and hosting the 14th Dalai Lama for seven teaching events in New York City:

- 1979 - One day teaching at the Cathedral Church of Saint John the Divine
- 1991 - The Kalachakra Initiation at the Paramount Theatre at Madison Square Garden, 2 weeks in total
- 1999 - Teaching on Kamalashila's Middle Length Stages of Meditation, and Togmay Sangpo's Thirty-Seven Practices of Bodhisattvas at the Beacon Theatre, also a public talk to 200,000 people in Central Park. The talks were later published as Open Heart: Practising Compassion in Everyday Life (2002).
- 2003 - Four-day teaching of Root Verses on Indian Philosophies by the 17th-century Tibetan scholar Jamyang Shepa, and The Seven-Point Mind Training by the 12th-century Geshe Chekawa at the Beacon Theatre, as well as a public talk in Central Park on The Bodhisattva's Jewel Garland by Atisha
- 2007 - Teachings on the Diamond Cutter Sutra, by Shakyamuni Buddha, and Seventy Verses on Emptiness, by Nagarjuna, as well as a public talk Peace and Prosperity, at Radio City Music Hall
- 2010 - Four-day teaching on Commentary on Bodhicitta by Nagarjuna, and A Guide to the Bodhisattva's Way of Life, by Shantideva, followed by a public talk entitled "Awakening the Heart of Selflessness", at Radio City Music Hall
- 2013 - Teachings on the Heart Sutra, The Sutra of the Recollection of the Three Jewels, and the ninth chapter of The Guide to the Bodhisattva's Way of Life, by Shantideva. Also an initiation into "The Buddha Establishing the Three Pledges", and a public talk on "The Virtue of Nonviolence", at the Beacon Theatre

== Location ==
Since 2014 TTC meets Monday at 7:00 pm at the University Settlement at Houston Street Center, on Bowery in Manhattan just south of Houston Street, and offers a regular Saturday White Tara session and other teaching events at the Kunkhyab Thardo Ling Retreat Home in South Orange, New Jersey.

== See also ==
- Khyongla Rato
- Nicholas Vreeland
