= Guido Santi =

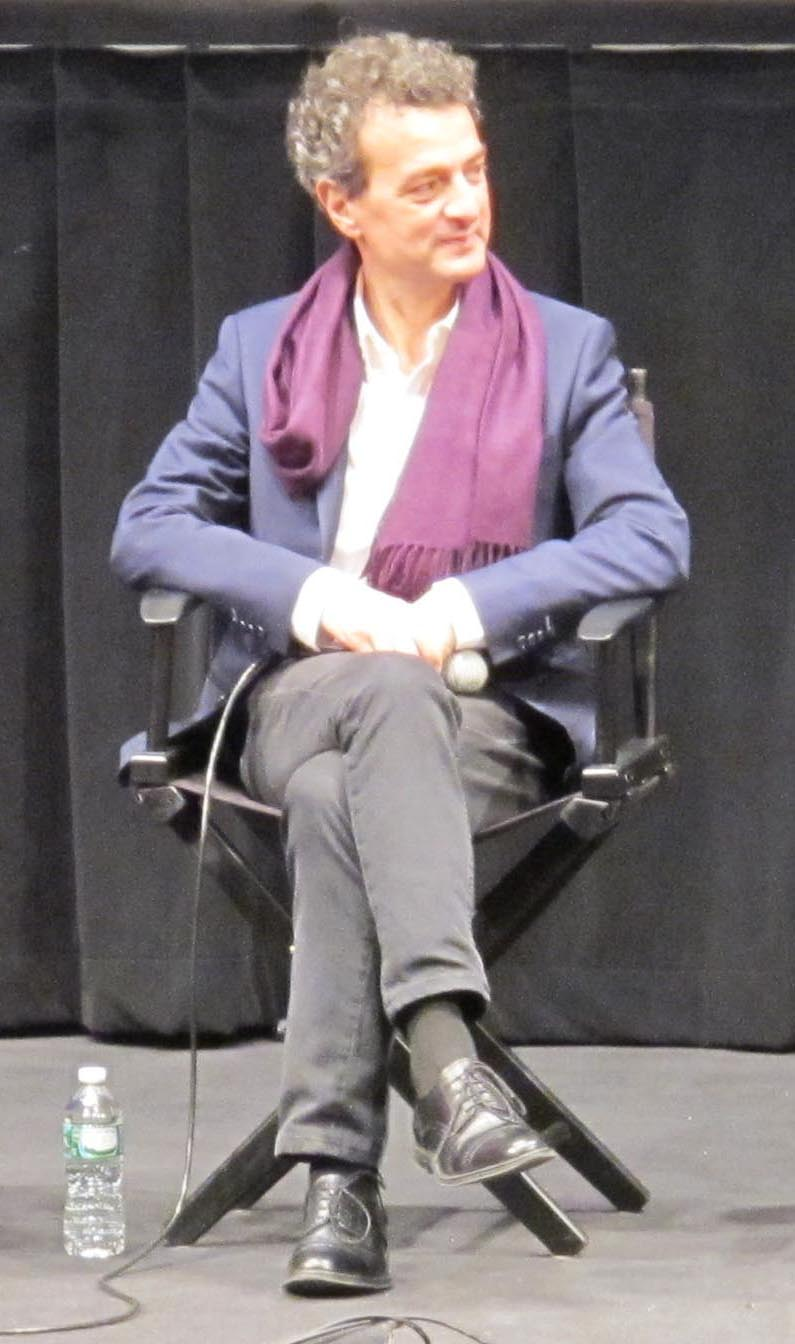
- Born: May 9, 1962; Genoa Italy
- Died: February 4, 2019 (aged 56); Santa Clarita, California
- Occupation(s): Film director, producer
- Spouse: Tina Mascara

Guido Santi (1962–2019) was an Italian filmmaker, director and producer. He lived and worked in Los Angeles, where he also taught at the College of the Canyons.

Santi is best known for two documentary films he made with his wife Tina Mascara: a 2007 film about Christopher Isherwood and his much younger partner Don Bachardy, and a 2013 film about the monk and photographer Nicholas Vreeland, who is Diana Vreeland's grandson.

== Life ==
Santi was born in Genoa, Italy, on May 9, 1962. He first worked in Italy, writing and directing short films, and working with other young filmmakers and the director Ermanno Olmi in a group called "Ipotesi Cinema". In 1989 he co-directed with Marco Simon Puccioni his first short film Concertino produced by RAI the Italian public broadcaster. Santi then moved to the US and took a master's degree in film production at the University of Southern California, and went on to produce TV specials and documentaries. With Tina Mascara he co-founded "Asphalt Stars Productions". Santi taught Film Aesthetics and History of Cinema at the College of the Canyons in Santa Clarita, California.

An article by Santi in the Huffington Post explains how he first met Don Bachardy in 1992, and how he eventually came to make the documentary Chris & Don, which was released in 2008.

== Death ==
Guido Santi died suddenly on February 4, 2019, due to a heart attack on the first day of College of the Canyon's Spring Semester.

== Filmography ==
Santi's films include:

- Monk with a Camera 2014
- Chris & Don 2008
- Mandala. The Journey of a Dancer: Daniel Ezralow 2003
- Cold Ground 1996
- Concertino 1990
