= Khyongla Rato =

Tibetan Buddhist scholar and teacher (1923–2022)

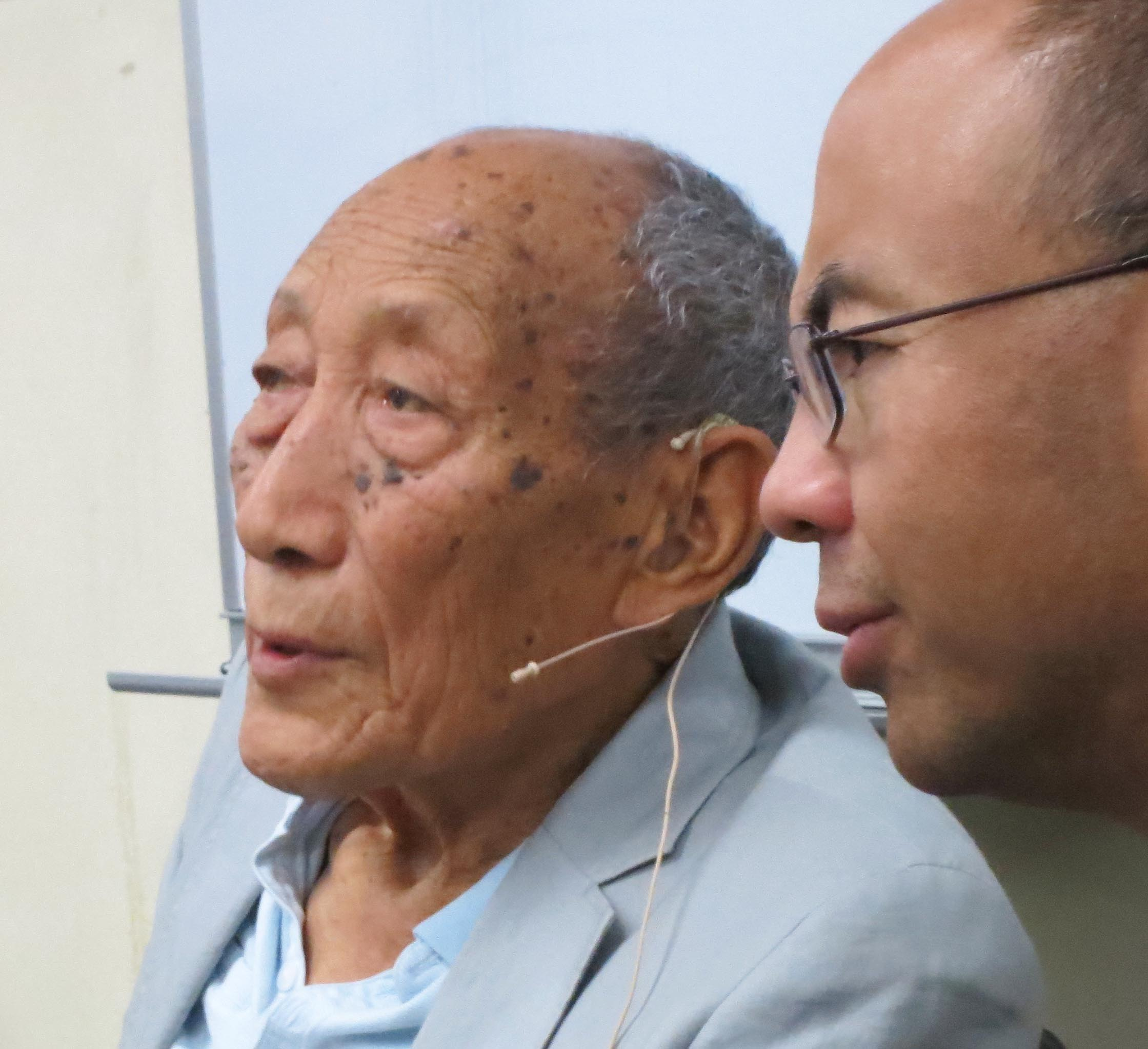
- Khyongla Rato in 2014 with his translator Tenzin Gelek
- Title: Rinpoche

Personal life
- Born: Norbu; 1923 Dagyab, Kham, Tibet
- Died: 24 May 2022 (aged 98–99) McLeod Ganj, Dharamsala, India
- Education: Geshe Lharampa
- Other names: Khyongla Rato Rinpoche, Rato Khyongla Rinpoche, Khyongla Rinpoche
- Occupation: Scholar, teacher, abbot

Religious life
- Religion: Tibetan Buddhism
- School: Rato Monastery, Drepung Monastery, Gyuto Tantric University
- Lineage: Gelug
- Dharma name: Nawang Losang

Senior posting
- Teacher: Ling Rinpoche
- Predecessor: 9th Khyongla Rinpoche
- Reincarnation: 1st Khyongla Rinpoche
- Students: Thubten Zopa Rinpoche, Joseph Campbell, Richard Gere, Adam Yauch, Nicholas Vreeland

Khyongla Rato (1923 – 24 May 2022), pronounced "Chungla," was also known as Khyongla Rato Rinpoche, Rato Khyongla Rinpoche, Khyongla Rinpoche, Ngawang Lobsang Shedrub Tenpai Dronme, and Nawang Losang, his monk's name. Born in Dagyab county in Kham province in southeastern Tibet, he was recognized as an incarnate lama at an early age. He spent over 30 years receiving teachings and studying as a highly trained monk in the Tibetan Buddhist monasteries of Tibet. A respected scholar, he was a debate partner of the 14th Dalai Lama at his Geshe examination in Lhasa, Tibet. He founded the Tibet Center in New York City. The center co-sponsored many of the Dalai Lama's teachings in New York City.

"Few people have known the Dalai Lama longer than Khyongla Rinpoche." Shortly after Rinpoche's death in May, 2022, the Dalai Lama noted that a "very good friend of mine recently passed away."

== Early life and education ==
Khyongla Rato Rinpoche was born in 1923, in the village of Ophor, south of Chamdo in the Dagyab province, Kham region, of what was then Tibet. In 1928, aged five, Norbu, as he was then known, was recognized as a tulku, incarnate lama, the tenth incarnation of Khyongla, a lama born in 1510 renowned for his teaching, known as the "Lama from Khyong Yul" or "Khyongla". On his 6th birthday Khyongla Rinpoche was taken to his labrang, a lama's residence.

He became a monk and studied at "two of the most important Geluk monasteries in Tibet," first at Rato Monastery, which specialized in debate, later moving to Drepung Monastery, where he received his Geshe Lharampa degree (equivalent to Doctor of Divinity), and finally to Gyuto Tantric University, where he served as abbot. Rinpoche studied with over seventy teachers, including Konchok Gyatso, Geshe Yeshe Loden, and from the age of 25 with Kyabje Ling Rinpoche, the senior tutor of the 14th Dalai Lama. While Khyongla Rinpoche was still quite young, he attended a teaching from Pabongkhapa Déchen Nyingpo, and this served as a significant inspiration to him.

In 1958, "Highly esteemed even as a newly minted Geshe, Khyongla Rato was the youngest of the lamas charged with debating the Dalai Lama during His Holiness’s examinations for the Geshe degree," during Monlam in Lhasa, Tibet. Altogether there were eighty challengers from ten monasteries. As Khyongla Rato says in his autobiography, on page 233, when it was his turn to debate, "For half an hour our thrilling interchange continued until the senior tutor, my good friend Ling Rinpoche, raised his hand and I returned to my place, exceedingly joyful and relieved."

== Exile and life in the west ==
In 1959, after the Chinese communists took over, Khyongla Rato left Tibet, crossing the Himalayas to India. While first in India, at the request of the Dalai Lama, Rinpoche helped write texts on the grammar, literature, history and religion of Tibet; these were used in the education of the families of Tibetan exiles.

Rinpoche was highly respected as a scholar and as a teacher's teacher. According to his student Lama Zopa Rinpoche he received many teachings from Rinpoche,

"a great treasury of lineages, holding the lineage of the entire teaching of Buddha, the Kangyur, and the Tengyur, as well as lineages of the collections of teachings and commentaries of all the pandits, or great scholars. Rinpoche has received the oral transmission of the Kangyur two times, first from his teacher at the place where he was born and the second time from, I think, Pari Dorje Chang, one the heart disciples of the great enlightened Pabongka. Pari Dorje Chang is the past life of this present incarnation, Pari Rinpoche. I think Khyongla Rato Rinpoche may also have received the oral transmission of the whole collection of Lama Tsongkhapa’s teachings two times. In Tibet and afterwards, Rinpoche received oral transmissions from many great lamas, who were like the sun rising in this world, bringing unbelievable benefit to sentient beings and to the teachings of Buddha. I and the other incarnate lamas who have the time are trying to receive the lineages of many teachings, especially the rare ones, and not only from Khyongla Rato Rinpoche. Otherwise, after some time, the lineages might end."

== The Tibet Center ==
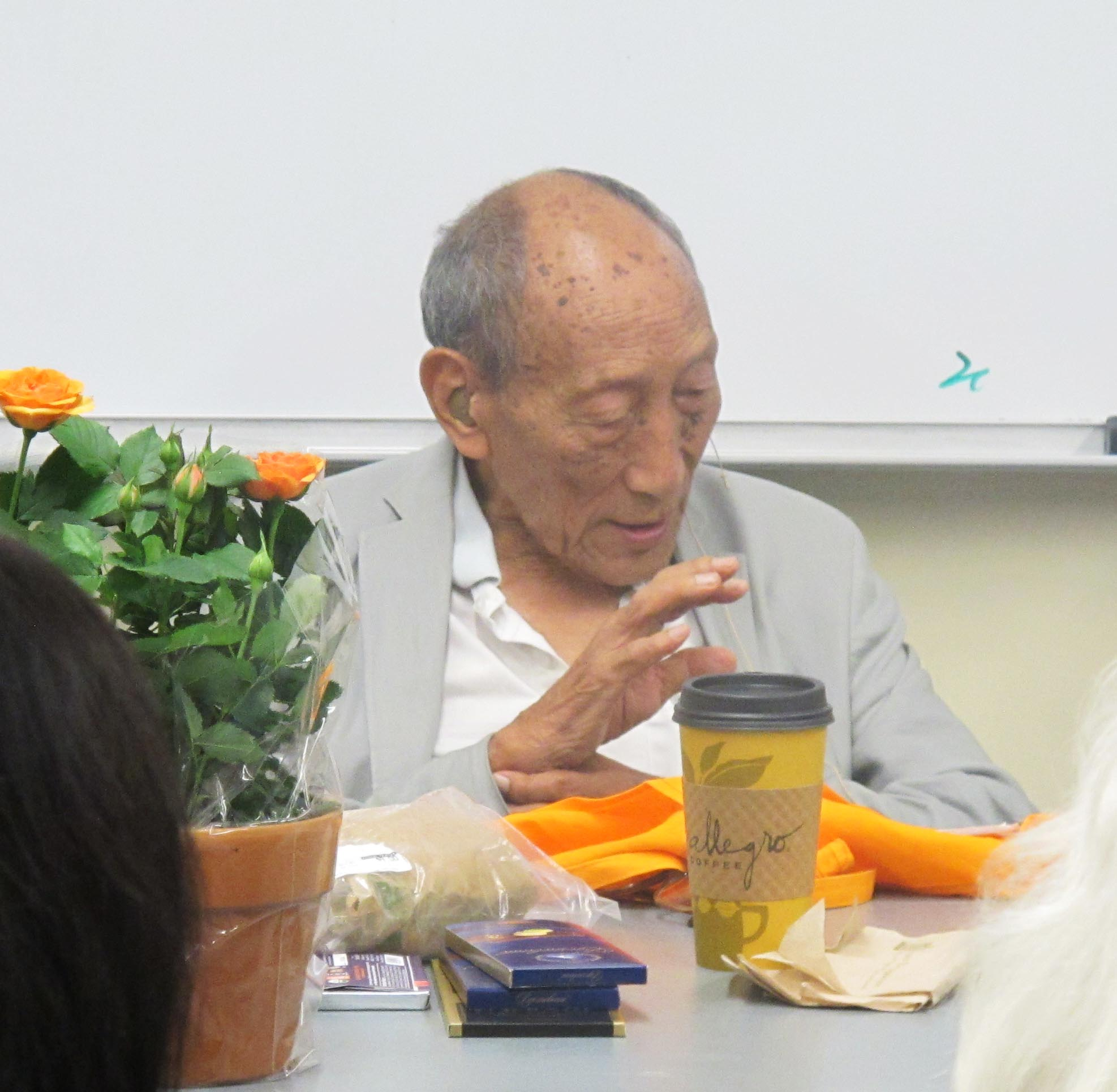
Khyongla Rato Rinpoche teaching on "Om Mani Padme Hum" on September 22nd, 2014, at The Tibet Center, NYC

In 1975, Khyongla Rato founded and was director of The Tibet Center in New York City, also known as Kunkhyab Thardo Ling (translation: Land pervaded with Seekers of Liberation), a name given to the center by the late Ling Rinpoche. Khyongla Rinpoche taught at the Tibet Center for almost 40 years, usually in English. Rinpoche and primarily Richard Gere, under the aegis of the Tibet Center and the Gere Foundation, sponsored seven teachings by the Dalia Lama in New York City, from 1979 to 2013.

Tibet Center students include Nicholas Vreeland, Lama Zopa Rinpoche, Richard Gere, Adam Yauch and Joseph Campbell. Many teachers from different traditions have taught at the Tibet Center. This includes Kyabje Ling Rinpoche, Tsenshab Serkong Rinpoche, Sakya Trizin Rinpoche, Trulshik Rinpoche of the Nyingma tradition, and Tenga Rinpoche of the Kagyu tradition, the current Ling Rinpoche, Lama Zopa Rinpoche, Venerable Robina Courtin, Venerable Amy Miller, Anthony Spina; Buddhists from the Chan, Theravadan and Zen traditions; teachers from the Jain, Hindu and Christian religions, as well as scientists and philosophers.

== Rato Monastery ==
Rinpoche was the senior reincarnate lama of Rato Monastery in India. Also known as Rato Dratsang, it was reestablished in 1983 in a Tibetan refugee settlement near Mungod, in Karnataka, India.

== Publications ==
While first in India, at the request of the Dalai Lama, Khyongla Rato Rinpoche helped to write texts on the grammar, literature, history and religion of Tibet. These were used in the education of the families of Tibetan exiles.

In the 1970s, as a result of urging from his students, Khyongla Rato wrote an autobiography, My Life and Lives, focusing primarily on his years in Tibet. Joseph Campbell, the American mythologist, edited the book and wrote the introduction.

In 2018, The Life of My Teacher:A Biography of Kyabje Ling Rinpoche, the only biography composed by the Dalai Lama, maintaining the tradition of students documenting the lives of their spiritual teaches, was published in Tibetan, and in English by Wisdom Publications. Khyongla Rinpoche, also a close student of the late Ling Rinpoche, "assisted with writing the biography."

== Film and photography ==
Despite having no prior acting experience, Khyongla Rato was asked to portray a monk in the 1993 film Little Buddha, directed by Bernardo Bertolucci, who "wanted the real thing." Rinpoche consulted the Dalai Lama, who told him he should go ahead and do this, so he ended up playing the role of the Abbot of a Tibetan Buddhist monastery in Bhutan. Rinpoche also has considerable screen time in the 2014 documentary Monk with a Camera, because he is the "root guru" of Venerable Nicholas Vreeland, the subject of that film.

A photographic exhibition featuring Rinpoche, Return to the Roof of the World, was held at the Leica Gallery in New York in 2011. It follows Nicholas Vreeland's journey as a photographer while accompanying his teacher on his return to his birthplace in Dagyab, eastern Tibet, forty-four years after he had left.

== Death and remembrance ==
Khyongla Rato Rinpoche died peacefully on May 24, 2022. At the time of his death, Rinpoche was living in a hotel outside of Dharamsala, in the suburb McLeod Ganj, within view of the home of the Dalai Lama. The cremation ceremony was held on May 29 at the Gyuto Tantric Monastery near Dharamsala. The Dalai Lama wrote A Prayer for the Swift Return of Rato Khyongla Rinpoche ending with a colophon which includes:

Furthermore, I myself summoned Rinpoche to accompany me when I was invited to celebrate the (two thousand five hundredth) anniversary of the Parinirvana of Lord Buddha in India. Also, when I sat for my debate examination on completing my monastic education, he was among those called on to debate with me. Later, when we came to India, as he was the heart son of Yongdzin Rinpoche Ling Dorje Chang, I asked him in the nineteen-sixties to go to teach in Western countries such as America, and during the time he was living there I had him carry out in various ways my vision. For those and other reasons, he became a trusted person with whom I could discuss inner matters. Now, since the one who passed away was rich in empowerments and transmissions and possessed vast knowledge of both Sutra and Tantra, not only do I mourn the loss of the senior student of my teacher Yongzin Rinpoche Ling Dorje Chang, but it is a great tragedy for the Geluk tradition in general, a cause for consternation. However, due to his pure motivation towards the Dharma, and his love for sentient beings, it is definite that Rinpoche will return. On this 28th day of the third month of the water tiger year of the sixteenth Tibetan cycle, which is the 27th day of May, 2022 of the western calendar, I—his Dharma friend, the Shakya Bhikshu and Propounder of Dharma, the Dalai Lama—have composed this prayer for Rinpoche’s swift return.

== Bibliography ==
- My Life and Lives: The Story of a Tibetan Incarnation, edited and with a foreword by Joseph Campbell, 1977, Rato Publications, New York ISBN 0-9630293-0-4, ISBN 978-0963029300
