= Tina Mascara =

American director, producer and writer

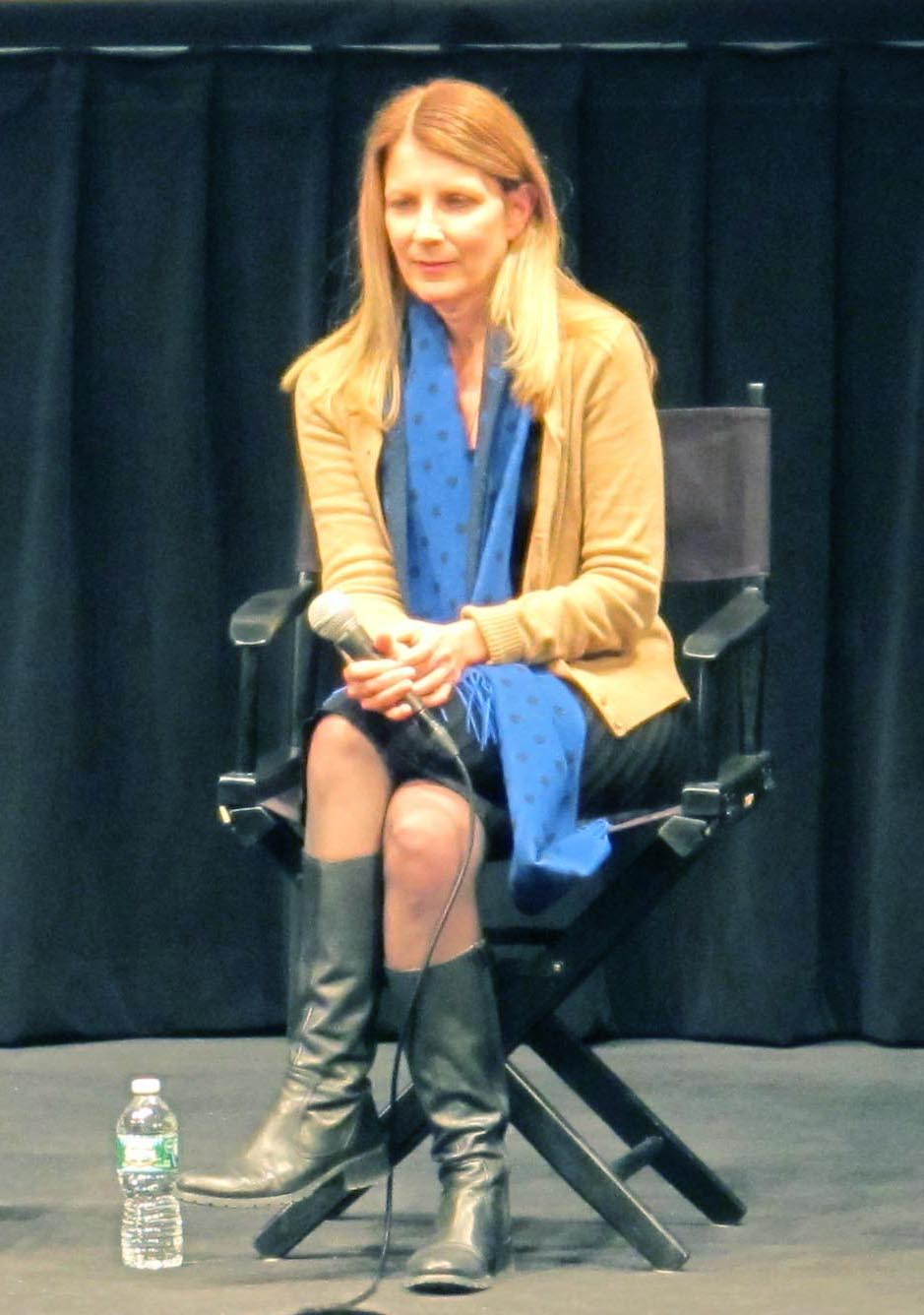
- Born: West Virginia, USA
- Occupation(s): Film director, producer
- Spouse: Guido Santi

Tina Mascara is an American director, producer and writer. She is best known for her documentary films, especially the two biographical documentaries (released in 2009 and 2014) which were made with her husband Guido Santi.

== History ==
Mascara was born in West Virginia. She is a graduate of the film program at Los Angeles City College. She was married to the director Guido Santi. With Guido Santi she co-founded "Asphalt Stars Productions".

Kirk Honeycutt in The Hollywood Reporter reviewing the film Chris & Don commented that Mascara and Santi are "superb filmmakers, fully alive in their terrific film … to all the undercurrents of art, social class, sexual orientation, challenging relationships and, most especially, the touching love story at the heart of their film."

== Filmography ==
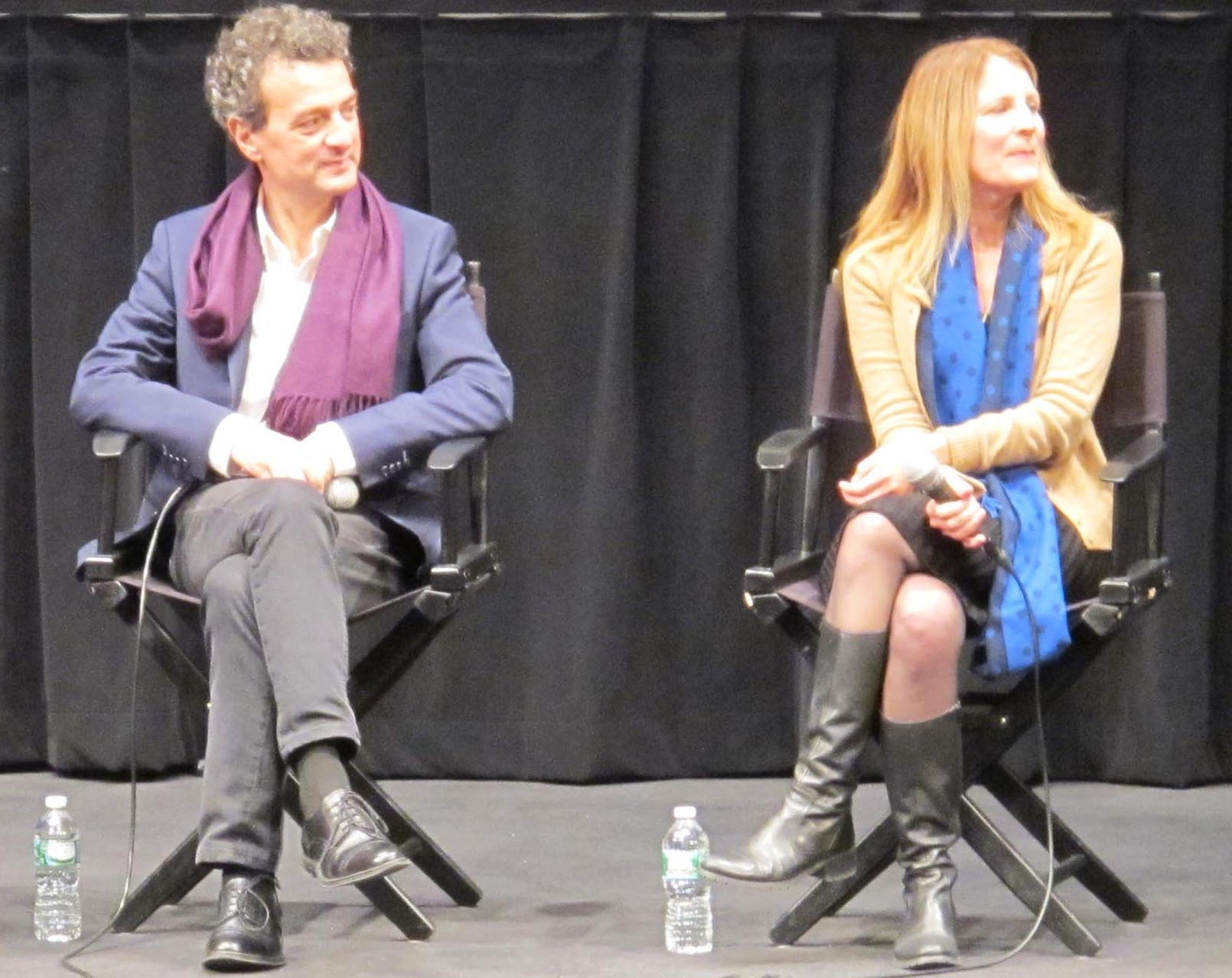
Guido Santi and Tina Mascara, the two directors of Monk with a Camera at the New York premiere

As director:

- Monk with a Camera: the Life and Journey of Nicholas Vreeland, 2014, with Guido Santi,
- Chris & Don: A Love Story, 2007 with Guido Santi
- Asphalt Stars, 2002
- Jacklight, 2000

As producer:

- Monk with a Camera: the Life and Journey of Nicholas Vreeland, 2014, with Guido Santi
- Chris & Don: A Love Story, 2007, with Guido Santi
- Asphalt Stars, 2002

As writer, producer and director:

- Asphalt Stars, 2002
- Jacklight, 2000

Asphalt Stars and Jacklight were shown at, and won awards at, the Madrid Film Festival, the Palm Springs Festival of Festivals and the Calcutta International Film Festival.
