= Open heart =

Open heart may refer to:

- Open-heart surgery, any kind of surgery in which a surgeon makes a large incision in the chest to open the rib cage and operate on the heart
- Open Heart (journal), an online open access journal publishing research into cardiology
- Open Heart (2007 film), a 2007 short documentary film about Palestinian healthcare
- Open Heart (2012 film), a 2012 short documentary film about Rwandan children
- Open Heart (TV series), a 2015 television series

== See also ==
- An Open Heart (disambiguation)
- Open Hearts, a 2002 Danish drama film
