= Abbot (Buddhism) =

Buddhist title in English-speaking countries

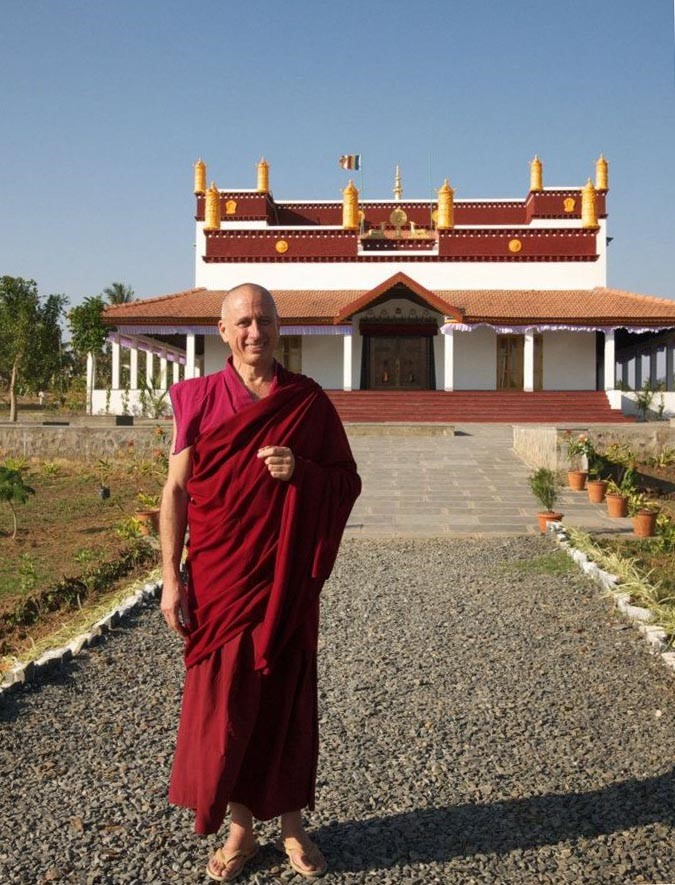
Khen Rinpoche Nicholas Vreeland was the first western monk to be made abbot of a major Tibetan Buddhist monastery, Rato Dratsang, in Karnataka, India

In Buddhism, the abbot (Pali: 𑀲𑀗𑁆𑀖𑀡𑀸𑀬𑀓, romanized: saṅghanāyaka) is the head of a Buddhist monastery or large Buddhist temple. In Buddhist nunneries, the nun who holds the equivalent position is known as the abbess (Pali: 𑀲𑀗𑁆𑀖𑀦𑀸𑀬𑀓𑀸, romanized: saṅghanāyakā).

In English-speaking countries, the English word "abbot" is used instead of all the various words that exist in the languages of the countries where Buddhism is, or was historically, well established.

== Role ==
An abbot is a monk who holds the position of administrator of a monastery or large temple. The administrative duties of an abbot or abbess include overseeing the day-to-day running of the monastery. The abbot or abbess also holds spiritual responsibility for the monastics under their care, and is required to interact with the abbots or abbesses of other monasteries.

== Languages other than English ==
Asian countries where Buddhism is still widely practiced have words in their own languages for the abbot of a Buddhist monastery or large temple:

=== Chinese ===
In Chinese Chan Buddhist monasteries, a common word for abbot is Fāngzhàng (方丈) meaning "one square zhàng (equal to ten feet square)", a reference to the size of Vimalakirti's stone room.

Another word for abbot is Zhùchí (住持), meaning "dweller" and "upholder." Monks and nuns tend to be addressed as Fǎshī (法師) meaning "Dharma teacher."

=== Japanese ===
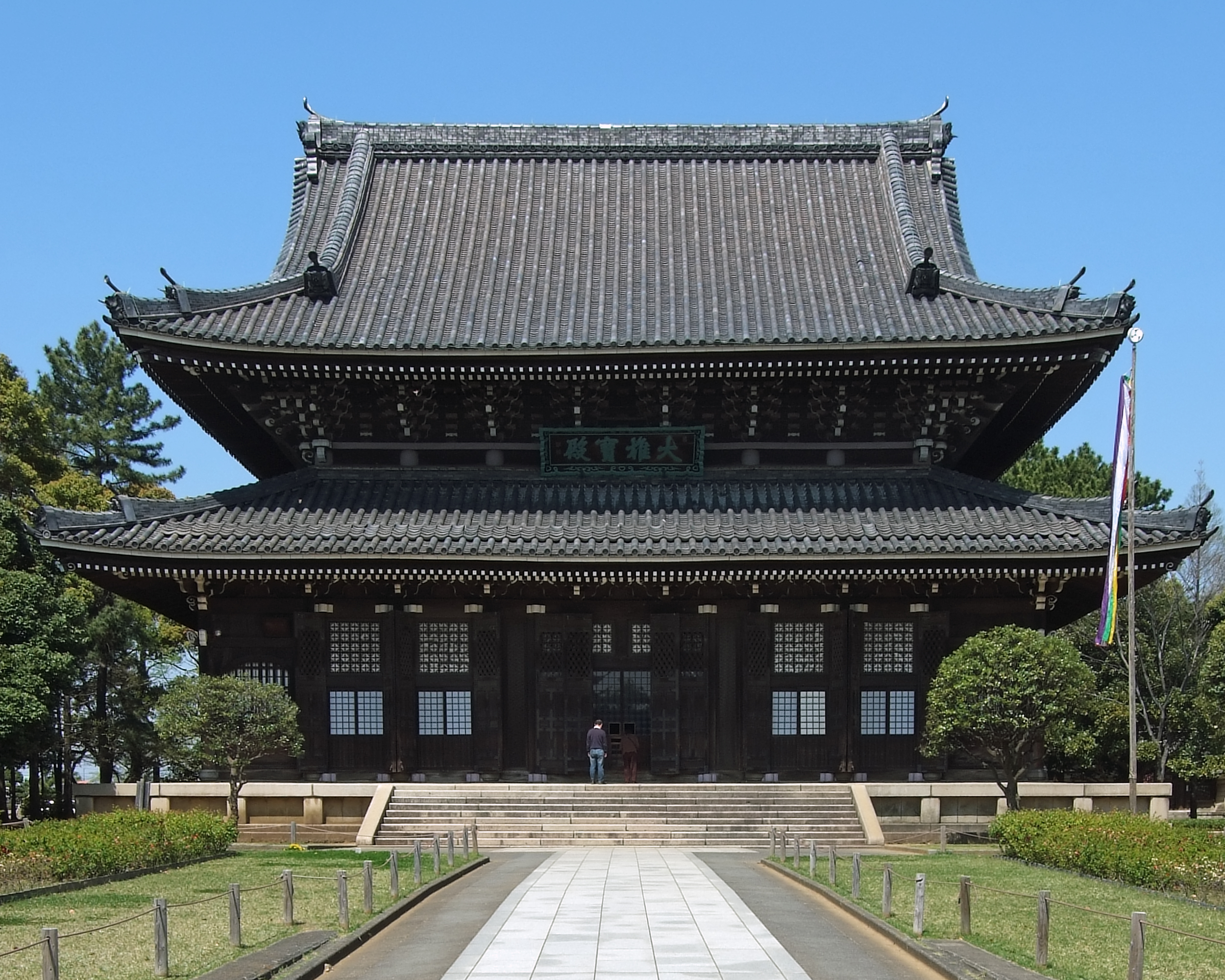
The abbot of Sōji-ji, temple of Zen Buddhism, Tsurumi-ku, Yokohama, Japan is a Zenji (禅師, Zen master).

In Japanese Buddhism, the most commonly used words for the abbot of a large temple or monastery are jūji (住持), jūjishoku (住持職), or simply jūshoku (住職). Occasionally the word jishu (寺主) is used as well, derived from the Sanskrit word vihārasvāmin which referred to the supervisor of a vihāra that contained a stupa.

A temple without a priest is denoted by the term mujū (無住).

==== Sectarian differences ====
The following table contains a non-exhaustive list of titles used among the many schools within Japanese Buddhism.

Sect	General term	Head of sect or temple
Risshū	和尚 (Wajō)	長老 (Chōrō)
Tendai	法印 (Hōin); 和尚 (Kashō); 阿闍梨 (Ajari)	座主 (Zasu); 執行 (Shigyō)
Shingon	法印 (Hōin); 前官 (Zengan); 和尚 (Wajō); 方丈 (Hōjō); 阿闍梨 (Ajari); 僧正 (Sōjō)	管長 (Kanchō); 長者 (Chōja); 化主 (Keshu); 門跡 (Monzeki); 座主 (Zasu)
Rinzai Zen	和尚 (Oshō); 方丈 (Hōjō); 老師 (Rōshi)	管長 (Kanchō)
Soto Zen	和尚 (Oshō); 方丈 (Hōjō); 老師 (Rōshi)	貫首 (Kanshu); 猊下 (Geika; rotates biennially)
Jōdo-shū	和尚 (Oshō)	門主 (Monsu); 法主 (Hossu)
Jōdo Shinshū	院家 (Inge); 院住 (Injū); 御前 (Onmae); 御院 (Goin)	門主 (Monshu); 門首 (Monshu); 法主 (Hossu)
Nichiren	上人 (Shōnin)	管長 (Kanchō); 貫首 (Kanju)
Others	尊師 (Sonshi); 教務 (Kyōmu) *院主 (Inju)	管主 (Kanzu); 別当 (Bettō); 能化 (Nōge)

As shown above, the term 和尚 (Oshō, etc.) can be pronounced several ways, depending on the tradition in question. Its origins are in the Sanskrit word upādhyāya originally referring to someone who conferred the precepts onto another.

Hōin (法印) was originally a title bestowed upon a monk by the emperor. The title is still used today on a rotating basis. Specifically in Koyasan Shingon Buddhism, a senior priest is appointed Hōin for a one year term to serve as officiant for all major ceremonies in Mount Koya. After their term has concluded, they receive the title Zengan (前官).

Shōnin (上人) is a title of respect to one who has attained a certain level of enlightenment. Goin (御院) and Inke (院家) refer to the temple proper.

In the case of Pure Land Buddhism, which de-emphasizes discipline in favor of household life, the words for abbacy tend to be a reflection of the institution rather than the person in charge. In the Kansai region, Goingesan (ご院家さん), Goinsan (御院さん) and Goensan (ご縁さん) are commonly used among Shin Buddhists. Abbacy also tends to be inherited from family lineage within Pure Land traditions.

Hōushu or Hossu (法主) is the title used by Ekan Ikeguchi at Saifuku-ji in Kagoshima. It is also used among the Seven Head Temples of Jōdo-shū and Taiseki-ji of Nichiren Shōshū.

In the Tendai tradition, the term Zasu 座主 is common. The abbot is also sometimes referred to as Yama no zasu (山の座主), meaning "Abbot of the mountain."

Monzeki (門跡) was a term reserved for priests of aristocratic or imperial lineage, and is still used today at Daikaku-ji of Shingon and Hongan-ji of Jōdo Shinshū.

=== Korean ===
The Korean word for abbot is juji (住持/주지).

=== Thai ===
The Thai term for the abbot of a temple (wat) is chaoawat (Thai: เจ้าอาวาส).

=== Tibetan ===
The abbot of a Tibetan Buddhist monastery is known as the Khenpo. This means "the one who gives the monks vows". The abbot is both addressed as and referred to as "Khen Rinpoche".

Another word used for more senior abbots is Khenchen, which means "senior khenpo."

=== Vietnamese ===
The Vietnamese word for abbot is trụ trì (住持).
