= Nicholas Vreeland =

Swiss American Buddhist monk

Nicholas Vreeland, Rato Khensur Thupten Lhundup
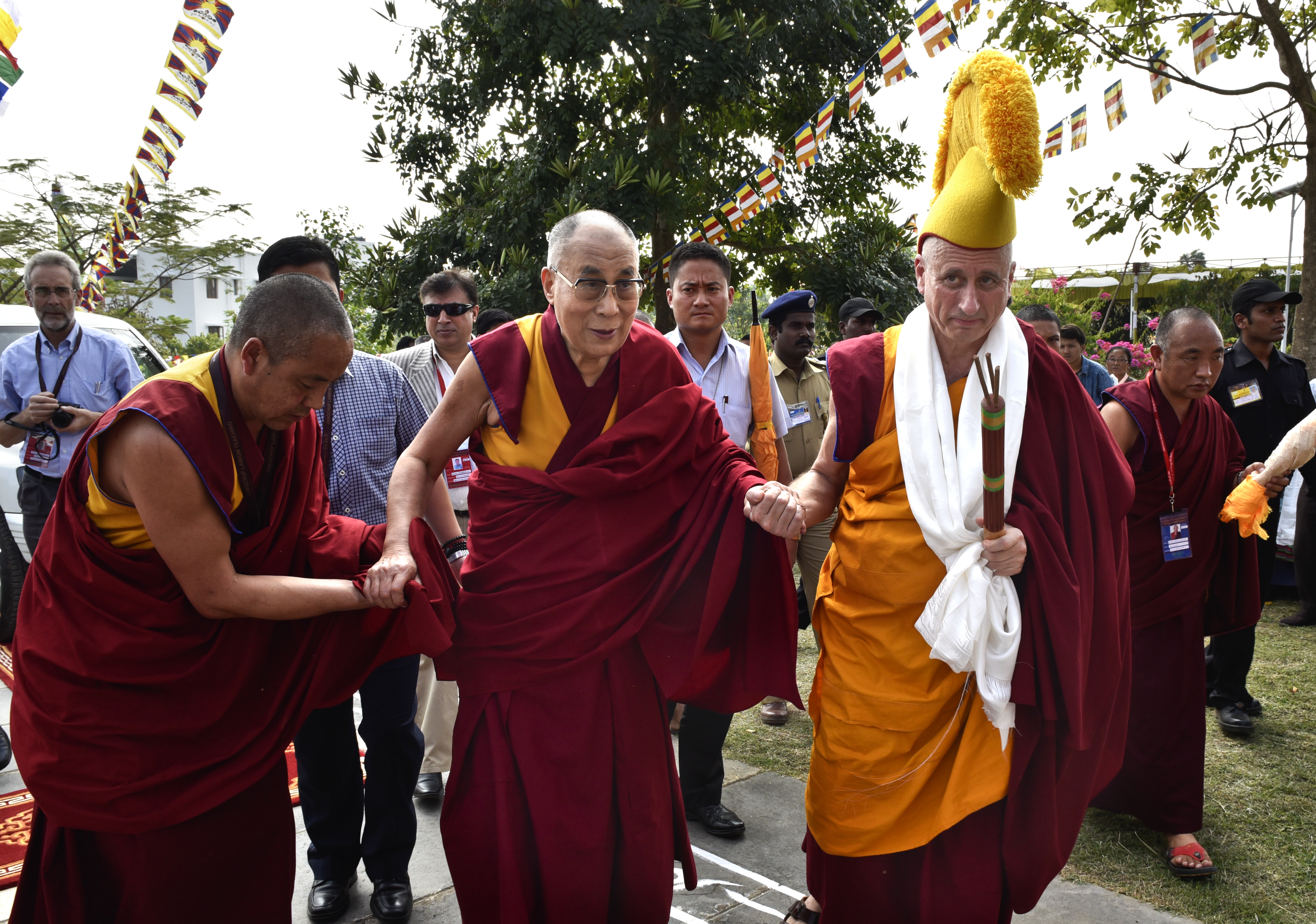
- His Holiness the Dalai Lama with Khen Rimpoche Nicholas Vreeland at Rato Dratsang, Mundgod, in the south Indian state of Karnataka.
- Title: Khensur Rinpoche

Personal life
- Born: Switzerland
- Parent(s): Frederick Vreeland; Elizabeth Breslauer Tompkins
- Education: Groton School, American University of Paris, New York University, Rato Dratsang
- Occupation: Buddhist Monk
- Relatives: Diana Vreeland (grandmother)

Religious life
- Religion: Tibetan Buddhism
- School: Gelug

Senior posting
- Teacher: Khyongla Rato Rinpoche
- Based in: Rato Dratsang

Nicholas Vreeland, also known as Rato Khensur Thupten Lhundup, is a Tibetan Buddhist monk and the former abbot of Rato Dratsang, a 14th-century Tibetan Buddhist monastery reestablished in India. Vreeland is also a photographer. He is the son of Ambassador Frederick Vreeland and grandson of Diana Vreeland, former editor-in-chief of Vogue magazine and special consultant to The Metropolitan Museum of Art's Costume Institute, where she set the "standard for costume exhibitions globally."

Vreeland spends his time between India and the United States, where he is the Director of Kunkhyab Thardo Ling—The Tibet Center, New York City's oldest Tibetan Buddhist center. He is also the first Westerner His Holiness the Dalai Lama appointed Abbot of a Tibetan Buddhist monastery, one of the important Tibetan government monasteries under his authority.

Monk with a Camera, a documentary film about Vreeland, was released in 2014.

== History ==
Vreeland was born in Geneva, Switzerland in 1954. He also lived in Germany and Morocco before coming to live in the United States at the age of 13 when his father was assigned to the United States Mission to the United Nations.

Vreeland attended Groton School in Massachusetts, where he became interested in photography. In the early 1970s, he attended The American University of Paris, subsequently receiving his BA in 1975 from New York University, where he studied film. He apprenticed to photographers Irving Penn and Richard Avedon.

In 1977, Vreeland began his studies of Buddhism with Khyongla Rato Rinpoche, a Tibetan lama sent to the West in the early 1960s by the 14th Dalai Lama to introduce Tibetan culture, Buddhist religion, and philosophy. On a photographic assignment in India in 1979, Vreeland met the Dalai Lama, and was asked to photograph the Dalai Lama's first trip to North America.

In 1985 Vreeland became a monk, joining Rato Dratsang in the Mungod Tibetan refugee settlement in the South Indian state of Karnataka, India, the "only Western person there for a long time." He was awarded a Geshe degree, equivalent to a PhD, in 1998, and returned to New York to assist his teacher, Khyongla Rato Rinpoche, and to help run The Tibet Center, Kunkhyab Thardo Ling, which Rinpoche founded. He became the director of The Tibet Center in 1999. Vreeland also helped raise the funds, in part through offering his photographs for sale, to enable Rato Dratsang to build a new monastic campus in Karnataka, India to accommodate an ever increasing monastic population. He chronicles his daily life through photographs displayed on his website.

Vreeland has edited two books by the Dalai Lama, An Open Heart: Practicing Compassion in Everyday Life, 2005, a New York Times bestseller, and A Profound Mind: Cultivating Wisdom in Everyday Life, 2011.

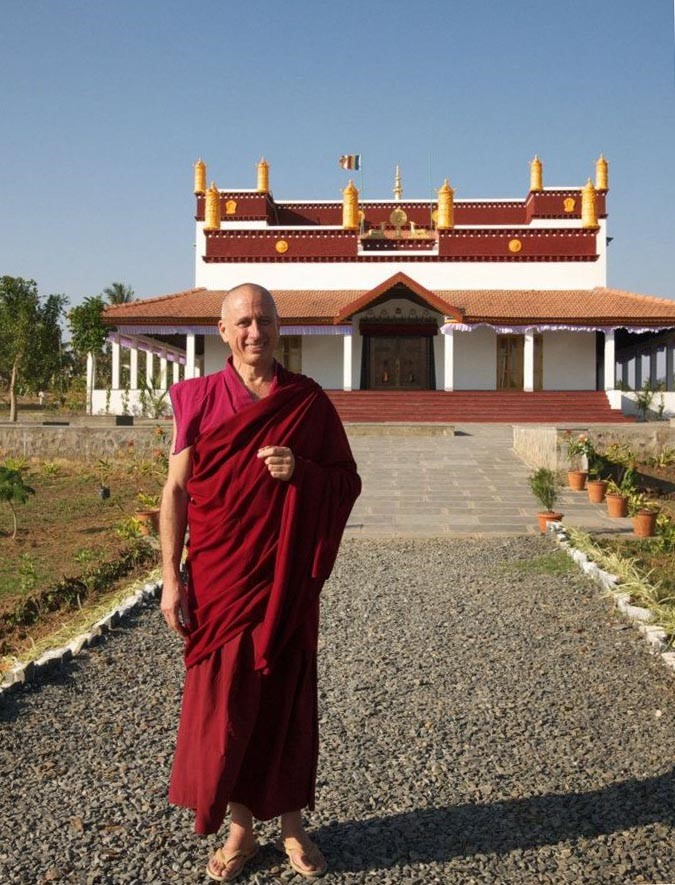
Temple at Rato Dratsang, January 2015

In 2012, the Dalai Lama appointed Vreeland abbot of Rato Dratsang. Considered one of the important Tibetan Government monasteries, it is known for its emphasis on the study of Buddhist philosophy and logic. He is the first Westerner to be appointed the Abbot of a Tibetan Buddhist monastery. This historic appointment symbolizes a convergence of Eastern and Western cultures within Tibetan Buddhist institutions. Upon making the appointment, the Dalai Lama explained that Vreeland's

"special duty [is] to bridge Tibetan tradition and [the] Western world."

In May 2014, Vreeland was awarded Honorary Doctorate degrees from The American University of Paris and John Cabot University in Rome.

== Documentary film ==
Monk with a Camera: The Life and Journey of Nicholas Vreeland, a biographical documentary film about Vreeland, was released in 2014. Variety noted "This pleasing documentary from Guido Santi and Tina Mascara charts the improbable story of Nicholas 'Nicky' Vreeland."

== Photography exhibitions ==
- An exhibition of twenty of Vreeland's images, Photos for Rato, has traveled to twelve cities around the world, and has raised funds to enable the rebuilding of Rato Monastery in India.
- Return to the Roof of the World, Leica Gallery, New York, NY, April 2011; Taipei, Taiwan February 2013; Palm Beach, Florida, April 2015. These were photographs taken when Vreeland accompanied Khyongla Rato Rinpoche on his return to the Dagyab district of Tibet.

== Bibliography ==
- An Open Heart: Practicing Compassion in Everyday Life, by H. H. the Dalai Lama (Author), Khyongla Rato (Afterword), Richard Gere (Afterword), Nicholas Vreeland (Editor), Little, Brown and Company, 2001, ISBN 0316989797, ISBN 978-0316989794, ISBN 0316930938, ISBN 978-0316930932, ASIN B000SEHT48, ASIN B00005QTHL
- A Profound Mind: Cultivating Wisdom in Everyday Life, by H. H. the Dalai Lama (Author), Nicholas Vreeland (Editor), Richard Gere (Afterword): Harmony, Random House, 2011, ISBN 0385514670, ISBN 978-0385514675, ISBN 0385514689, ISBN 978-0385514682, ASIN B004KPM1RQ
