= Little Buddha =

- Theatrical release poster
- Directed by: Bernardo Bertolucci
- Screenplay by: Rudy Wurlitzer; Mark Peploe
- Story by: Bernardo Bertolucci
- Produced by: Jeremy Thomas
- Starring: Keanu Reeves; Chris Isaak; Bridget Fonda; Alex Wiesendanger; Ying Ruocheng
- Cinematography: Vittorio Storaro
- Edited by: Pietro Scalia
- Music by: Ryuichi Sakamoto
- Production companies: Miramax Films; Recorded Picture Company; Ciby 2000
- Distributed by: Penta Distribuzione (Italy); AMLF (France); Buena Vista International (United Kingdom)
- Release dates: 1 December 1993 (France); 29 April 1994 (United Kingdom)
- Running time: 140 minutes
- Countries: Italy; France; United Kingdom
- Language: English
- Budget: $35 million
- Box office: $48 million

Little Buddha is a 1993 drama film directed by Bernardo Bertolucci, written by Rudy Wurlitzer and Mark Peploe, and produced by usual Bertolucci collaborator Jeremy Thomas. An international co-production of Italy, France and the United Kingdom, the film stars Chris Isaak, Bridget Fonda and Keanu Reeves as Prince Siddhartha (the Buddha before his enlightenment).

== Plot ==
Tibetan Buddhist monks from a monastery in Bhutan (Rinpung Dzong), led by Lama Norbu, are searching for a child who is the rebirth of a great Buddhist teacher, Lama Dorje. Lama Norbu and his fellow monks believe they have found a candidate for the child in whom Lama Dorje is reborn: an American boy named Jesse Conrad, the young son of an architect and a teacher who live in Seattle. The monks come to Seattle in order to meet the boy.

Jesse is fascinated with the monks and their way of life, but his parents, Dean and Lisa, are wary, and that wariness turns into near-hostility when Norbu announces that he wants to take Jesse back with him to Bhutan to be tested. Dean changes his mind, however, when one of his close friends and colleagues commits suicide because he went broke. Dean then decides to travel to Bhutan with Jesse. In Nepal, two children who are also candidates for the rebirth are encountered, Raju and Gita.

In Lumbini, Nepal, a prince called Siddhartha turns his back on his comfortable and protected life, and sets out on a journey to solve the problem of universal suffering. As he progresses, he learns profound truths about the nature of life, consciousness, and reality. Ultimately, he battles Mara (a demon representing the ego), who repeatedly tries to divert and destroy Siddhartha. Through the final complete realization of the illusory nature of his own ego, Siddhartha attains enlightenment and becomes the Buddha.

Sometime later, it is found that all three children are rebirths of Lama Dorje, separate manifestations of his body (Raju), speech (Gita), and mind (Jesse). A ceremony is held and Jesse's father also learns some of the essential truths of Buddhism. His work finished, Lama Norbu enters a deep state of meditation and dies. As the funeral ceremony begins, Lama Norbu speaks to the children, seemingly from a higher plane, telling them to have compassion; the children are then seen distributing his ashes.

In a post-credits scene, the sand mandala that was seen being constructed during the movie is destroyed with a stroke.

== Cast ==
- Keanu Reeves as Siddhartha
- Ying Ruocheng as Lama Norbu
- Chris Isaak as Dean Conrad
- Alex Wiesendanger as Jesse Conrad
- Bridget Fonda as Lisa Conrad
- Raju Lal as Raju
- Greishma Makar Singh as Gita
- Sogyal Rinpoche as Kenpo Tenzin
- Ven. Geshe Tsultim Gyelsen as Lama Dorje
- Ven. Khyongla Rato Rinpoche as Abbot
- Jo Champa as Maria
- Jigme Kunsang as Champa
- Thubtem Jampa as Punzo
- Surekha Sikri as Sonali (as Surehka Sikri)
- T.K. Lama as Sangay
- Doma as Ani la
- Santosh Bangera as Channa (charioteer of prince Siddhartha)
- Anupam Shyam as Mara

== Production ==
=== Casting ===
Three Tibetan incarnate high lamas, also known as tulkus or rinpoche, have roles in the film. "I wanted the real thing," said Bertolucci. The Venerable Khyongla Rato Rinpoche plays the part of the Abbot of the monastery in Bhutan. Dzongsar Jamyang Khyentse Rinpoche appears near the end of the film, when Lama Norbu is shown meditating overnight, and as a consultant, supervised every gesture and ritual performed by Tibetan monks. Sogyal Rinpoche appears in the earlier segments in the role of Khenpo Tenzin. In a later documentary about Khyentse Rinpoche entitled Words of my Perfect Teacher, his role in the film is discussed along with a short interview with Bertolucci.

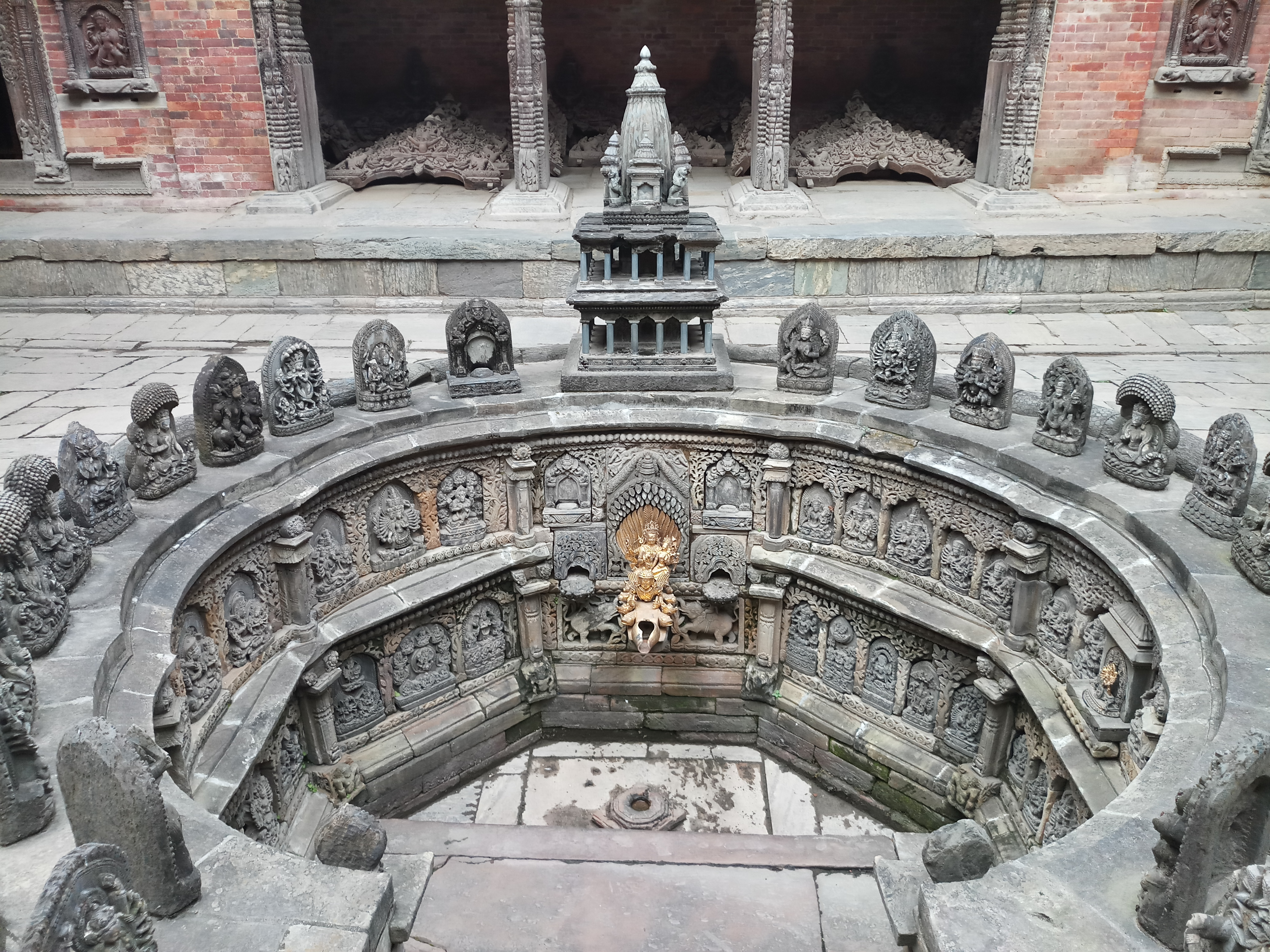
Tusha Hiti in Patan, Nepal, doubled as the king's bath

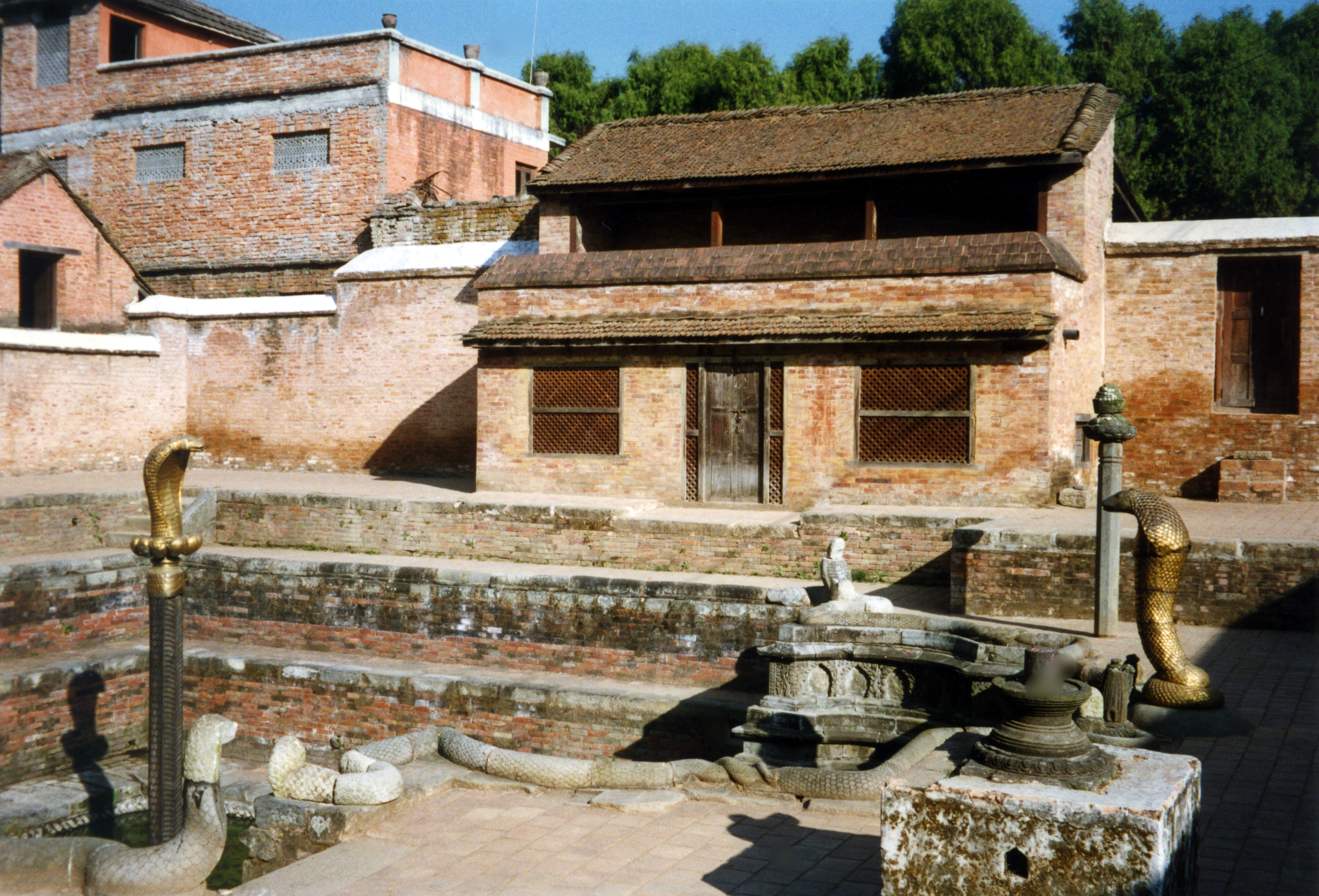
Thanthu Darbar Hiti in Bhaktapur was also used as a location.

=== Filming ===
The Buddha flashback scenes of Little Buddha were photographed in 65 mm Todd-AO by cinematographer Vittorio Storaro. The rest of the film was filmed in 35 mm anamorphic Technovision.

Jeremy Thomas later remembered making the film:

It was an interest in the story of Siddhartha, and what Tibetan Buddhism meant in Western society after the expulsion from Tibet. It was a very ambitious film, and largely shot in Kathmandu and Bhutan on location. And Bhutan, it was a joy to film in Bhutan ... But like many things when you look back of course, trying to promote a film about Buddhism as an epic is maybe a tall order.

Thomas formed a bond with the Bhutanese Tibetan Buddhist Lama Dzongsar Jamyang Khyentse Rinpoche who was an advisor on the film, and went on to help him make several other films such as The Cup (1999) and Travelers and Magicians (2003).

In addition to Kathmandu, other prominent Nepalese locations used in the film are the cities of Bhaktapur and Patan. Some scenes were filmed in and around Rinpung Dzong.

== Soundtrack ==
Little Buddha

Soundtrack album by Ryuichi Sakamoto
- Released: 6 April 1994 (Japan); 14 June 1994 (International)
- Genre: Classical
- Length: 63:05
- Labels: For Life Records (Japan); Milan Records (International)
- Producer: Ryuichi Sakamoto

Ryuichi Sakamoto chronology
Heartbeat (1991)	Little Buddha (1994)	Sweet Revenge (1994)

The soundtrack for the film was entirely composed by Japanese pianist/composer Ryuichi Sakamoto.

Track listing

1. "Main Theme" 2:50
2. "Opening Titles" 1:47
3. "The First Meeting" 1:50
4. "Raga Kirvani" 1:28
5. "Nepalese Caravan" 3:01
6. "Victory" 1:45
7. "Faraway Song" 3:18
8. "Red Dust" 4:38
9. "River Ashes" 2:25
10. "Exodus" 2:33
11. "Evan's Funeral" 4:28
12. "The Middle Way" 1:50
13. "Raga Naiki Kanhra / The Trial" 5:25
14. "Enlightenment" 4:28
15. "The Reincarnation" 1:52
16. "Gompa - Heart Sutra" 2:38
17. "Acceptance - End Credits" 8:57

One of the themes Sakamoto had composed for the film was refused by the director and became the title track of the 1994 album Sweet Revenge, a facetious allusion to Bertolucci's decision.

In a 2018 interview with British website The Arts Desk, Sakamoto stated that the final music cue from Little Buddha (“Acceptance”) was his favorite piece from all of his film scores.

== Release ==
The film had its world premiere in France on 1 December 1993, opening on 187 screens.

== Reception ==
=== Critical reception ===
The film received mixed to positive reviews. It currently holds a 63% approval rating on review aggregator Rotten Tomatoes, based on 27 reviews with an average rating of 5.9/10. The website's critics consensus reads: "Little Buddha's storytelling may be too childlike to best service its audacious plot, but Bernardo Bertolucci's direction and Vittorio Storaro's cinematography conspire to deliver a visually strong epic." Metacritic, which uses a weighted average, assigned the film a score of 57 out of 100, based on 33 critics, indicating "mixed or average" reviews.

Roger Ebert gave the film only two stars, and called it "a slow-moving and pointless exercise by Bertolucci, whose The Last Emperor was a much superior telling of a similar story about a child who is chosen for great things."

Desson Howe of The Washington Post called the film "beguiling [and] unpretentious", adding that "Bertolucci intermixes high art with childlike wonder, blatant special effects with tacit spirituality."

Janet Maslin wrote in The New York Times:

Little Buddha, a crazily mesmerizing pop artifact that ranks alongside Herman Hesse's novel Siddhartha in terms of extreme earnestness and quasi-religious entertainment value, finds Mr. Bertolucci working in an uncharacteristic vein. For all its obvious seriousness, Little Buddha has a naïve, miracle-gazing intensity that turns it into Mr. Bertolucci's first Spielberg movie, complete with awestruck faces and intimations of higher knowledge. This is also the filmmaker's first close encounter with visual tricks like morphing, which makes for religious experience of another kind.

=== Box office ===
The film was very successful in France, where it was the 19th highest-grossing film of the year, with 1,359,483 admissions. In its opening week in France, it sold 308,660 tickets for a gross of $1.52 million. The film opened on 6 screens in the United Kingdom and grossed £39,066 in its opening weekend. The film, against competition from such films as The Flintstones and Maverick, opened at number nine at the US box office. It dropped out of the top ten the next week, closing on June 16, 1994 at number 13, with a total of $4.8 million. It grossed $48 million worldwide against its $30 million budget.

=== Awards and nominations ===
The film was nominated for one Razzie Award, Worst New Star for Chris Isaak.

== Year-end lists ==
- 10th – Desson Howe, The Washington Post
- Top 10 runner-ups (not ranked) – Janet Maslin, The New York Times
- Honorable mention – Betsy Pickle, Knoxville News-Sentinel
- Honorable mention – Dan Craft, The Pantagraph

== See also ==
- Depictions of Gautama Buddha in film
