= An Open Heart (book) =

2002 book by the Dalai Lama Tenzin Gyatso

- Author: Tenzin Gyatso; Nicholas Vreeland
- Language: English
- Subject: Buddhism
- Published: 2002
- Publisher: Little, Brown and Company
- ISBN: 0-316-93093-8

An Open Heart is a book written by the Dalai Lama Tenzin Gyatso and Nicholas Vreeland published by Little, Brown and Company, in 2002 ISBN 0-316-93093-8 The book explains the fundamentals of Buddhism.
