= Rato Dratsang =

Tibetan Buddhist monastery in Mundgod, Karnataka, India

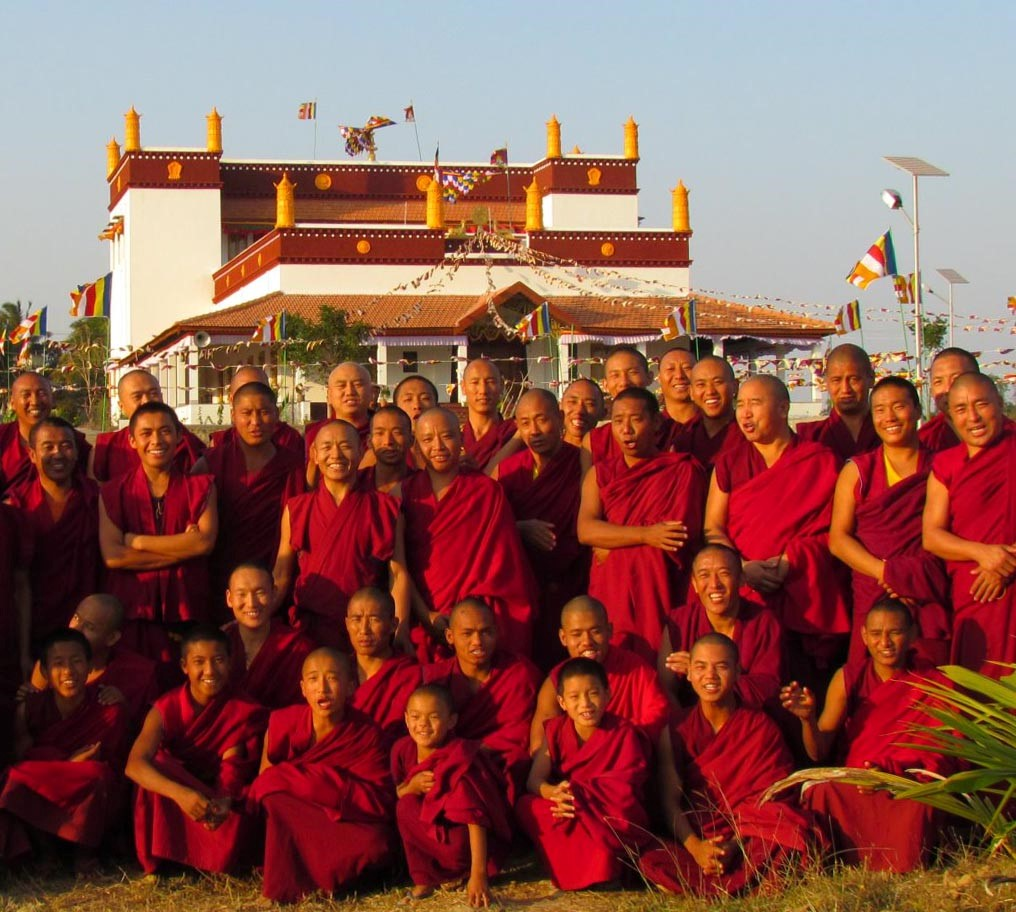
- Rato monks in front of the temple at Rato Monastery, January 2015.

- Location within Karnataka Location within India

Religion
- Affiliation: Tibetan Buddhism
- Sect: Gelug
- Leadership: The 14th Dalai Lama

Location
- Location: Currently in the Tibetan Settlement, Mundgod, Karnataka, India, (originally in Central Tibet)
- Country: India
- Interactive map of Rato Dratsang
- Coordinates: 15.0326°N 75.00°E

Architecture
- Founder: Tak Pa Zang Bo
- Established: 14th century

Rato Dratsang (Dratsang in Tibetan means 'monastery', lit. "monk's nest"), also known as Rato Monastery (sometimes spelled Ratö Monastery), Rato Dratsang is a Tibetan Buddhist monastery of the Gelug or "Yellow Hat" order. For many centuries, Rato Dratsang was an important monastic center of Buddhist studies in Central Tibet.

The 5th Dalai Lama, Ngawang Lobsang Gyatso (1617–1682), referred to Rato Dratsang as Taktsang, or Tiger Nest, because of its fine scholars and debaters. The monastery served as a center for the study of Buddhist philosophy and logic; monks from many other monasteries came to Jang, under Rato’s authority, every year to intensively study and rigorously debate logic.

After 1959, Rato Dratsang was reestablished in a Tibetan Refugee Settlement in Mundgod, Karnataka State, in southern India. The original Rato Dratsang exists in Tibet.

In 1985, the Rato Dratsang Foundation, was established as a 501(c)(3) nonprofit organization to help the monastery flourish and grow.

In 2012, the Dalai Lama appointed a westerner monk, Nicholas Vreeland, to be Rato Dratsang’s new Abbot.

== History ==
Rato Monastery was founded on the outskirts of Lhasa, the capital city of Tibet, in the 14th century by Tak Pa Zang Bo.

During the 17th century, the Great Fifth Dalai Lama called Rato the "Tiger Nest", commenting in verse:

"In the heart of the dense forest of
Scriptural knowledge,
Lies the Tiger Nest sounding
The roar of the wisdom of logic.
May the study of logic to clear the minds,
Forever develop in the boundaries of the upper,
Middle, and lower parts of the land of snow."

Khyongla Rato Rinpoche, (1923–2022), founder of The Tibet Center, Kunkhyab Thardo Ling, in New York City, studied at the original Rato Monastery when he was a young monk. In 1959, about 500 monks studied at Rato.

In 1983, Rato Dratsang was re-established in a Tibetan refugee settlement near Mungod, in Karnataka, India. The monastery initially consisted of a temple, a few monks' room, and a kitchen, all in a two-story building on one quarter-acre of land given to the few surviving Rato monks who had come from Tibet, by Drepung Loseling Monastery. A few years later, Rato Chuwar Rinpoche was appointed Abbot of Rato Dratsang by the Dalai Lama.

Over time, more land was acquired. In 2008, a plan was created by the Delhi architectural firm Pradeep Sachdeva Design Associates (PSDA) and construction of a new monastic campus began. The new Rato Temple was inaugurated by the Dalai Lama in January 2011.

As of 2020, there are over 100 monks at Rato Dratsang.

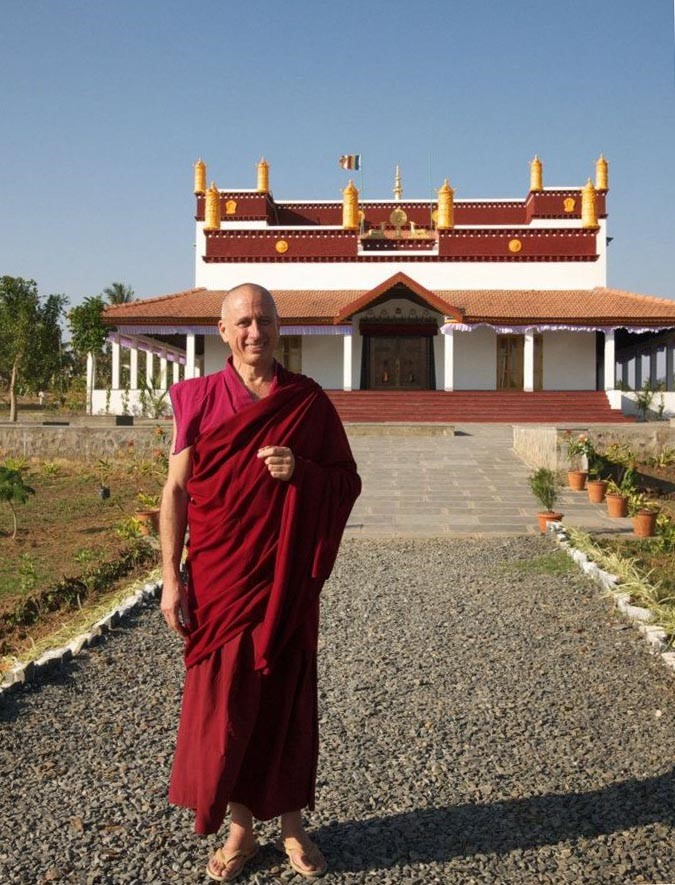
Khen Rinpoche (Nicolas Vreeland) in front of the newly inaugurated Rato temple, January 2015

When Rato Dratsang was first reestablished in Karnataka in India, it was administered as part of the re-established Drepung Loseling monastery, which is in the same area. In the late 1980s, however, Rato was able to become a separate monastery or monastic university.

In May 2012, the 14th Dalai Lama appointed Geshe Thupten Lhundup (Nicholas Vreeland) as the new abbot of the monastery. This was the first time that a westerner had been appointed abbot of a major Tibetan Buddhist monastery. Rato Dratsang is "one of a few important Tibetan Government monasteries under the patronage of His Holiness the Dalai Lama".

Rato Monastery is featured extensively in the 2014 documentary film, Monk with a Camera.

== The Rato Dratsang Foundation ==
In 1986, Kyongla Rato Rinpoche and Geshe Thupten Lhundup (Nicholas Vreeland), along with some of their friends, created Rato Dratsang Foundation, a 501(c)(3) non-profit foundation, in order to "generate financial support for the monastery, establish scholarly affiliations with Western centers of higher education, provide for the translation and publication of important writings currently unavailable to English-speaking and Chinese-speaking people, and establish a sister monastic college in the west."
