= Camp (style) =

Ostentatious style and sensibility

Camp is an aesthetic and sensibility that regards something as appealing or amusing because of its heightened level of artifice, affectation, and exaggeration, especially when there is also a playful or ironic element. Camp aesthetics often disrupted modernist understandings of high art by inverting traditional aesthetic judgements of beauty, value, and taste, and inviting a different kind of aesthetic engagement.

Camp art is distinct from but often confused with kitsch. The big difference between camp and kitsch is mainly that camp is aware of its artificiality and pretense.

The American writer Susan Sontag emphasized camp's key elements as embracing frivolity, excess, and artifice. Art historian David Carrier notes that, despite these qualities, it is also subversive and political. Camp may be sophisticated, but subjects deemed camp may also be perceived as being dated, offensive, or in bad taste. Camp may also be divided into high and low camp (i.e., camp arising from serious versus unserious matters), or alternatively into naive and deliberate camp (i.e., accidental versus intentional camp). While author and academic Moe Meyer defines camp as a form of "queer parody", journalist Jack Babuscio argues it is a specific "gay sensibility" which has often been "misused to signify the trivial, superficial, and 'queer'".

Camp, as a particular style or set of mannerisms, may serve as a marker of identity, such as in camp talk, which expresses a gay male identity. This camp style is associated with incongruity or juxtaposition, theatricality, and humour, and has appeared in film, cabaret, and pantomime. Both high and low forms of culture may be camp, but where high art incorporates beauty and value, camp often strives to be lively, audacious, and dynamic. Camp can also be tragic, sentimental, and ironic, finding beauty or black comedy even in suffering. The humour of camp, as well as its frivolity, may serve as a coping mechanism to deal with intolerance and marginalization in society.

== Origins and development ==
The Oxford English Dictionary notes that the word camp was used as a verb since at least the 1500s. Writer Bruce Rodgers also traces the term camp to the 16th century, specifically to British theatre, where it referred to men dressed as women (drag). Camp may have derived from the gay slang Polari, which borrowed the term from the Italian campare, "to live, to get by", or from the French term se camper, meaning "to pose in an exaggerated fashion". A similar sense is also found in French theatre in Molière's 1671 play Les Fourberies de Scapin.

Writer Susan Sontag and linguist Paul Baker place the "soundest starting point" for the modern sense of camp, meaning flamboyant, as the late 17th and early 18th centuries. Writer Anthony Burgess theorized it may have emerged from the primary sense of the word, as in a military encampment, where gay men would subtly advertise their sexuality in all-male company through a particular style and affectation.

By 1870, British crossdresser Frederick Park referred to his "campish undertakings" in a letter produced in evidence at his examination before a magistrate at Bow Street, London, on suspicion of illegal homosexual acts; the letter does not make clear what these were.

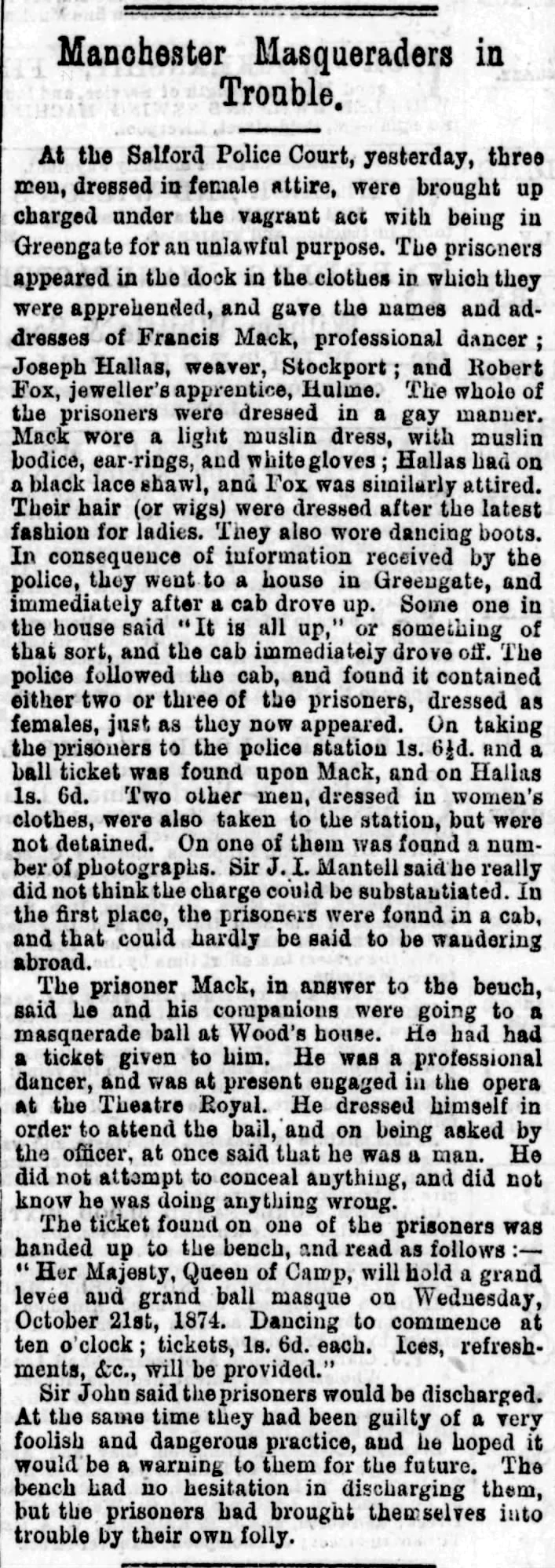
Report of the ticket for a Salford drag ball in 1874

In 1874, the Manchester Courier printed the description of a ticket for a Salford drag ball, called the "Queen of Camp" ball. (Note: The paper, reporting on the arrest of a man attending the event in drag, said: "Upon searching Mack, he found upon him...a ticket upon which was printed—'Her Majesty Queen of Camp will hold a levee and grand bal-masque on Wednesday, Oct 21st, 1874. Dancing to commence at ten o'clock'".) According to the Oxford English Dictionary, the first definitive use of camp as an adjective in print occurred in the writing of J. R. Ware in 1909. In the UK's pre-liberation gay culture, the term was used as a general description of the aesthetic choices and behavior of working-class gay men. The term camp is still sometimes used in the UK to describe a gay man who is perceived as outwardly garish or eccentric, such as Matt Lucas's character Daffyd Thomas in the English comedy skit show Little Britain.

From the mid-1940s, numerous representations of camp speech or camp talk, as used by gay men, began to appear in print in America, France and the United Kingdom. By the mid-1970s, camp was defined by the college edition of Webster's New World Dictionary as "banality, mediocrity, artifice, [and] ostentation ... so extreme as to amuse or have a perversely sophisticated appeal".

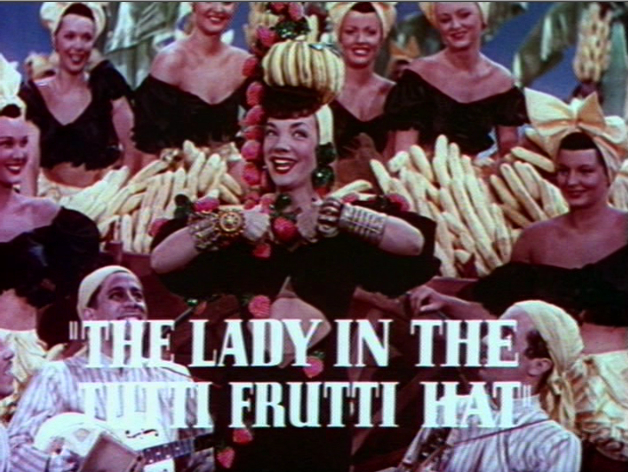
Carmen Miranda in the trailer for The Gang's All Here (1943)

In America, the concept of camp was also described by Christopher Isherwood in 1954 in his novel The World in the Evening, and later by Susan Sontag in her 1964 essay 'Notes on "Camp"'. Two key components of the "radical spectacle of camp" were originally feminine performances: swish and drag. With swish's extensive use of superlatives and drag's exaggerated female impersonation, camp occasionally became extended to all things "over the top", including women posing as female impersonators (faux queens) such as Carmen Miranda, while also retaining its meaning as "queer parody".

In her study of drag, cultural anthropologist Esther Newton argued that camp has three major features: incongruity, theatricality, and humour. In his 1984, writer George Melly argued that the camp sensibility allowed almost anything to be seen as a camp, and that this was a way of projecting one's own queer sensibility upon the world to therefore reclaim it. Conversely, he argued, the biggest threat to camp wasn't heterosexuals ("who tend to accept it, although usually at a fairly broad and superficial level"), but "a neo-puritanism, a received conformism" emerging among gay people at the time.

The rise of postmodernism and queer theory has made camp a common perspective on aesthetics, not solely identified with gay men. Women (especially lesbians), trans people, and people of colour have described new forms of camp, such as dyke camp (including subcategories such as cubana and high-femme dyke camp) and queer of color camp.

Camp has also been a subject of psychoanalytic theory, where it has been portrayed as a form of performance or masquerade. Scholar Cynthia Morrill has argued that the conception of "camp-as-masquerade" ignores the specifically queer sensibility of camp by interrogating queerness through a heteronormative lens (i.e., solely in relation to the symbol of the phallus).

Camp has become prevalent in mainstream popular entertainment such as theatre, cinema, TV and music. In reaction to its popularisation, critics such as Jack Babuscio and Jeanette Cooperman have argued that camp requires the alienation of LGBTQ+ people from the mainstream to maintain its edge. Poet and scholar Chris Philpot, like Cooperman, nevertheless argues that camp can still be a viable "survival strategy" for marginalized queer people, so long as it evolves with them. Curator Andrew Bolton, after his show Camp: Notes on Fashion at the New York Metropolitan Museum of Art, explains that context is also important for understanding the power and relevance of camp: "Camp tends to come to the fore through moments of social and political instability, when our society is deeply polarized. The 1960s is one such moment, as were the 1980s, so, too, are the times in which we're living."

== Camp in contemporary culture ==
=== Fashion ===
Patrick Kelly's designs have been described as camp and "Radical Cheek" for his ironic use of bold colours, antiquated or incongruous styles, and reclaimed racist symbols. He designed a banana dress in reference to Josephine Baker and dedicated a whole collection to her. He used mismatched buttons when creating his own take on a Chanel suit. By the time he died in 1990, he had dressed noted queer icons such as Grace Jones and Isabella Rossellini. His grave is marked with a stylized golliwog—a reclaimed symbol for his label—featuring big gold earrings and bright red lips.

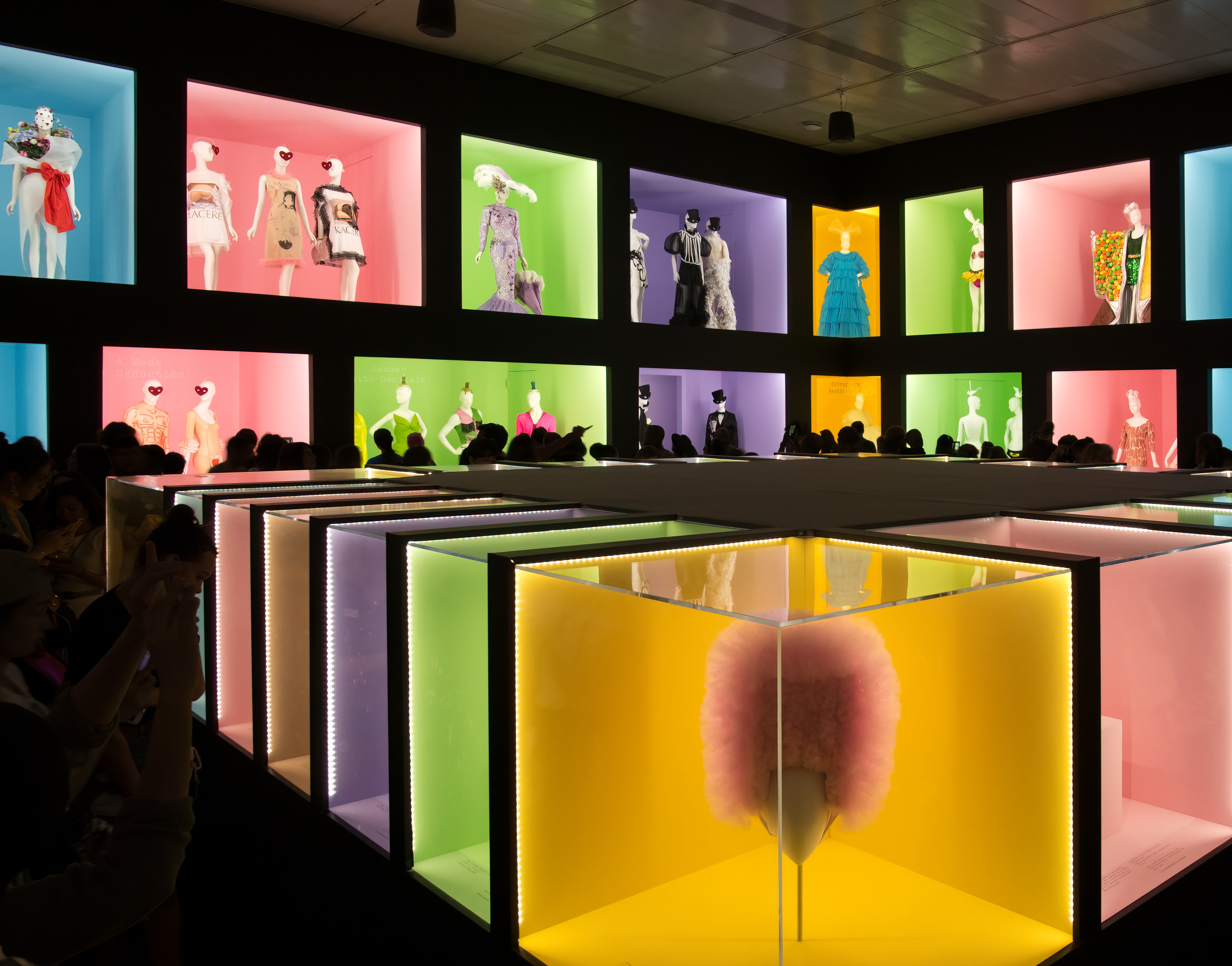
Clothing designs from Camp: Notes on Fashion

The 2019 Met Gala's theme was Camp: Notes on Fashion, co-chaired by Anna Wintour, Serena Williams, Lady Gaga, Harry Styles, and Alessandro Michele. The show featured tributes to queer and camp figures, including a bronze statue of the Vatican's Belvedere Antinous, portraits of Louis XIV and Oscar Wilde, and celebrations of Black and Latinx ball culture and the Harlem Renaissance. Dapper Dan—whose luxurious fashion has been credited with camping up the hip-hop genre—designed seven camp outfits for Gucci, worn at the gala by 21 Savage, Omari Hardwick, Regina Hall, Bevy Smith, Ashley Graham and Karlie Kloss (he wore the seventh).

Lady Gaga's entrance took 16 minutes, as she arrived to the gala alongside an entourage of five dancers carrying umbrellas, a make up artist, and a personal photographer to snap pictures of Gaga's poses. Gaga arrived in a hot pink Brandon Maxwell gown with a 25-foot train and went through a series of four "reveals," paying homage to drag culture, debuting a new outfit each time, until reaching her final look: a bra and underwear with fishnets and platform heels. Other notable ensembles included Katy Perry wearing a gown that looked like a chandelier, designed by Moschino; and Kacey Musgraves appearing as a life-size Barbie, also by Moschino.

=== Film ===
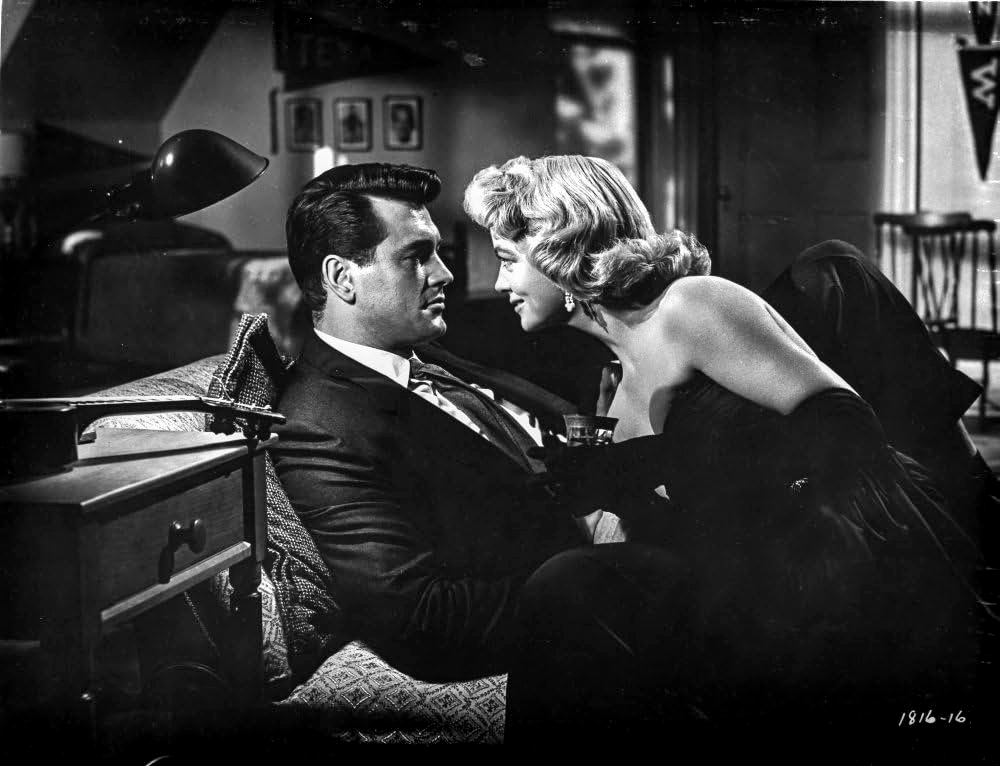
Several melodrama films, like Douglas Sirk's Written on the Wind (1956), have acquired cult status because of their unintentional camp content.

Melodrama films have been celebrated for their unintentional camp content by gay male culture long before critics and academics first defined the genre in the 1970s. Some writers have even considered the genre to be "cinema made for and by gay men." In addition to the films of Douglas Sirk (the greatest exponent of melodrama), several works by Vincente Minnelli, Nicholas Ray, George Cukor, Billy Wilder and Joseph Losey acquired cult status among gay men because of the "very excessiveness, extreme emotionality, mannered performances, style and very direct sentimental form of address that these films demonstrate". Several features of the family melodrama, later emphasized by film theorists as integral to the subversive and progressive essence of the genre, were precisely the attributes that gay men found humorous. Several later exponents of gay cinema, like John Waters, Pedro Almodóvar, Rainer Werner Fassbinder and Todd Haynes, among others, have cited campy melodramas as a major influence.

Famous representatives of camp films are, for example, John Waters (Pink Flamingos, 1972) and Rosa von Praunheim (The Bed Sausage, 1971), who mainly used this style in the 1970s, and who created films which achieved cult status. The 1972 musical Cabaret is also seen as an example of the aesthetic, with film critic Esther Leslie describing the camp in the film thus:

Camp thrives on tragic gestures, on lament at the transience of life, on an excess of sentiment, an ironic sensibility that art and artifice is preferable to nature and health, in a Wildean sense.

Australian writer/director Baz Luhrmann's Red Curtain Trilogy, in particular the film Strictly Ballroom (1992), has been described as camp.

The term camp is also used prominently in the horror genre, with examples including Killer Klowns from Outer Space and the Evil Dead franchise. Since the 2000s, other horror films reported as camp are ThanksKilling (2008), Drag Me to Hell (2009), The Burning Dead (2015), M3GAN (2022), and Hemet, or the Landlady Don't Drink Tea (2023).

=== Literature ===
"I am strongly drawn to Camp, and almost as strongly offended by it. That is why I want to talk about it, and why I can."—Essayist Susan Sontag in Notes on "Camp"(1964).

Dandyism is often seen as a precursor to camp, especially as embodied in Oscar Wilde and his work. The character of Amarinth in Robert Hichens's The Green Carnation (1894), based on Wilde, uses "camp coding" in his "effusive and inverted" use of language.

The scene where Anthony Blanche arrives late to Sebastian Flyte's lunch party in Evelyn Waugh's Brideshead Revisited, has been described by writer George Melly as an example of camp's "alchemical ability" to project a queer sensibility upon the world and unite one's peers in that sensibility.

The first post-World War II use of the word in print may be Christopher Isherwood's 1954 novel The World in the Evening, where he comments: "You can't camp about something you don't take seriously. You're not making fun of it; you're making fun out of it. You're expressing what's basically serious to you in terms of fun and artifice and elegance."

In the American writer Susan Sontag's 1964 essay Notes on "Camp", Sontag emphasized the embrace of artifice, frivolity, naivety, pretentiousness, offensiveness, and excess as key elements of camp. Examples cited by Sontag included Tiffany lamps, the drawings of Aubrey Beardsley, Tchaikovsky's ballet Swan Lake, and Japanese science fiction films such as Rodan and The Mysterians of the 1950s. However, critics of Sontag's description, such as art historian David Carrier, say that it is outdated and that "her celebration of its ecstatic marginality downplays its implicit subversiveness".

In Mark Booth's 1983 book Camp, he defines camp as "to present oneself as being committed to the marginal with a commitment greater than the marginal merits". He makes a distinction between genuine camp, and camp fads and fancies — things that are not intrinsically camp, but display artificiality, stylization, theatricality, naivety, sexual ambiguity, tackiness, poor taste, stylishness, or camp people, and thus appeal to them.

In his 1984 book Camp: The Lie That Tells The Truth, writer and artist Philip Core describes Jean Cocteau's autobiography as "the definition of camp".

In 1993, journalist Russell Davies published comedian Kenneth Williams's diaries. Williams's diary entry for 1 January 1947 reads: "Went to Singapore with Stan—very camp evening, was followed, but tatty types so didn't bother to make overtures."

=== Music ===
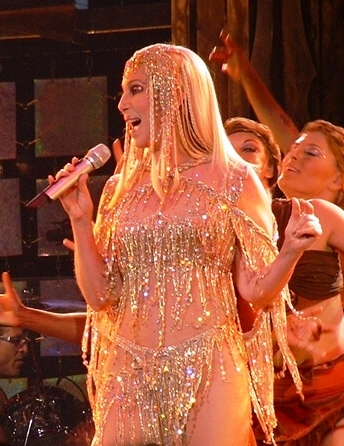
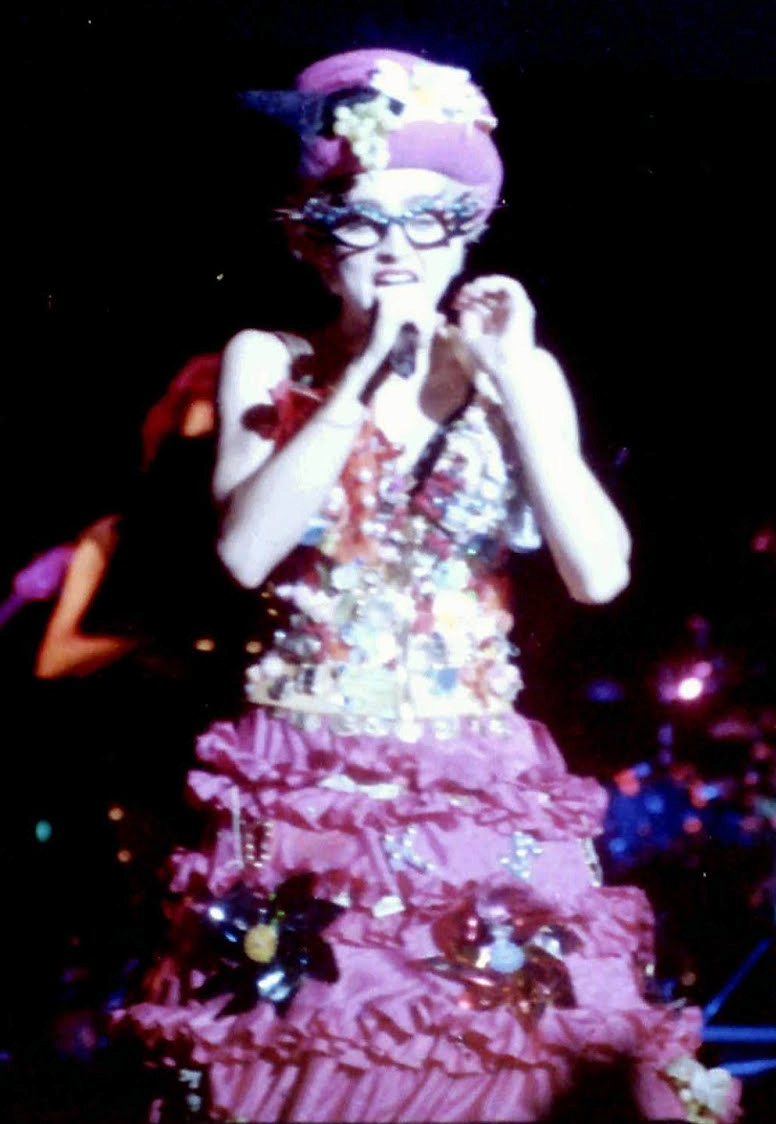
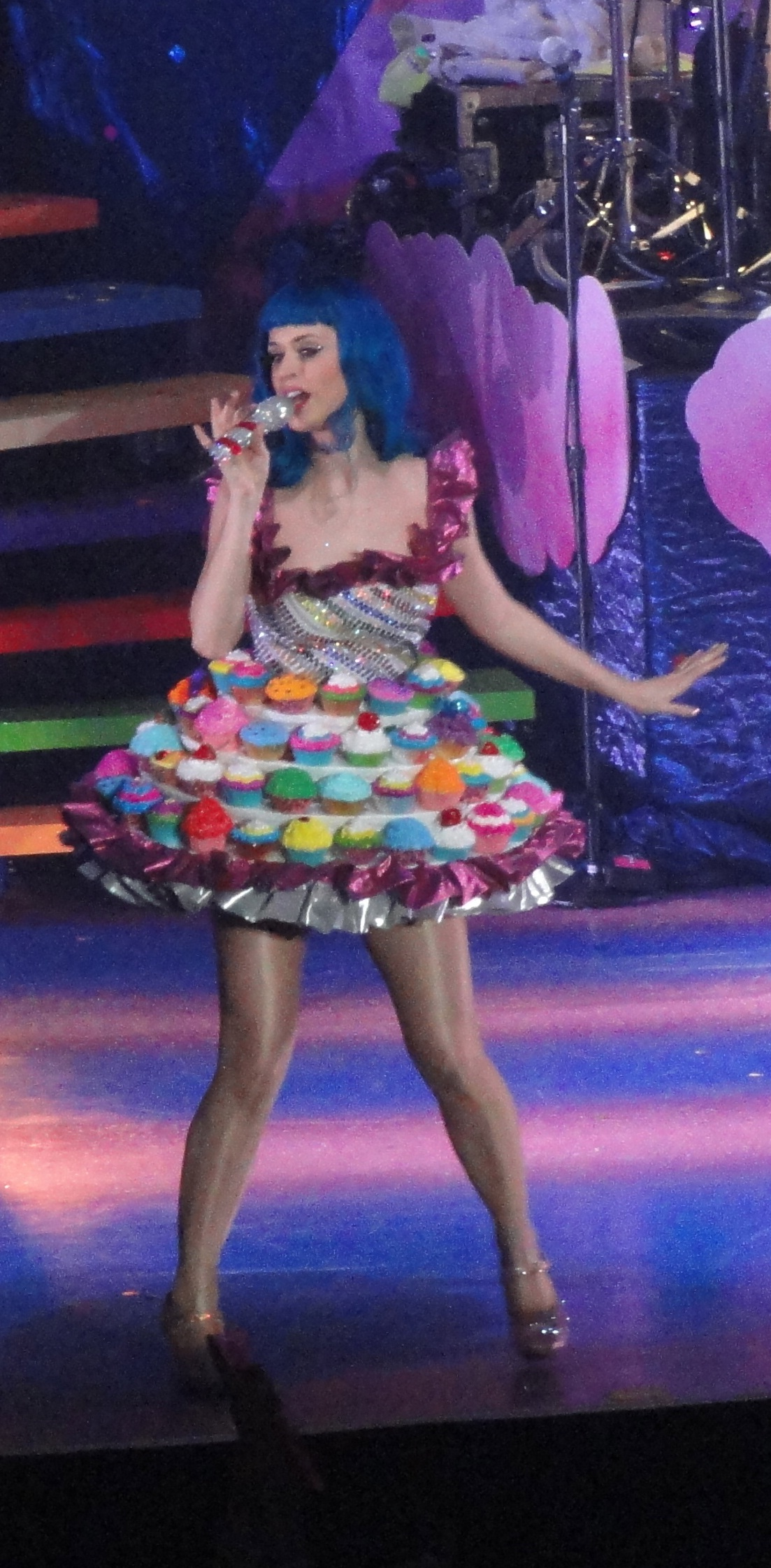
Camp costuming worn by American pop singers Cher, Madonna, and Katy Perry

American singer and actress Cher is one of the artists who received the title of "Queen of Camp" through her colourful on-stage fashion and live performances. She gained this status in the 1970s when she launched her variety shows in collaboration with the costume designer Bob Mackie and became a constant presence on American prime-time television. Madonna is also considered camp and according to educator Carol Queen, her "whole career up to and including Sex has depended heavily on camp imagery and camp understandings of gender and sex". Madonna has also been named "Queen of Camp".

In public and on stage, Dusty Springfield developed an image supported by her peroxide blonde beehive hairstyle, evening gowns, and heavy make-up that included her much-copied "panda eye" look. Springfield borrowed elements of her look from blonde glamour queens of the 1950s, such as Brigitte Bardot and Catherine Deneuve. This, her singing style and her sexuality made her a "camp icon" and won her a following in the gay community. Besides the prototypical female drag queen, she was presented in the roles of the "Great White Lady" of pop and soul, and the "Queen of Mods".

Rappers such as Lil' Kim, Nicki Minaj and Cam'ron have all been described as camp, often because of the opulence and winking humour of their personas. Dapper Dan has been credited with introducing high fashion and camp to hip-hop. In pop and rock, musicians Prince and Jimi Hendrix have also been called camp because of their flamboyance and playful use of artifice.

South Korean rapper Psy, known for his viral internet music videos full of flamboyant dance and visuals, has come to be seen as a 21st-century incarnation of camp style. Geri Halliwell is recognized as a camp icon for her high camp aesthetics, performance style and kinship with the gay community during her time as a solo artist.

Dancer, singer and actress Josephine Baker has been described as camp. Her banana dress has been noted as particularly camp for its flamboyant, humorous, and ironic qualities. It also makes a political point by using outdated but reclaimed imagery.

Lady Gaga, a contemporary exemplar of camp, uses music and dance to make social commentary on pop culture, as in the "Judas" music video. Her clothes, makeup, and accessories, created by high-end fashion designers, are integral to the narrative structure of her performances. Katy Perry has also been described as camp, with outlets like Vogue describing her as another "Queen of Camp".

The British tradition of the "Last Night of the Proms" has been said to glory in "nostalgia, camp, and pastiche". Camp still forms a strong element in UK culture, and many so-called gay icons and objects are chosen as such because they are camp, including musicians such as Elton John, Kylie Minogue, Lulu, and Mika.

Musicologist Philip Brett has highlighted campness in the work of Benjamin Britten and has also argued for a camp reading of French composer Francis Poulenc's Concerto for Two Pianos in D minor, noting its combination of a Balinese gamelan with a sense of "musical resignation and longing".

Musicologist Raymond Knapp has compared musical camp to jazz, especially in camp's playfulness and admiration for its subjects, which can seem mocking but often borders on veneration. He argues that musical camp draws attention to its performativity and inspirations, while engaging the audience interactively in the process of creating meaning.

=== Photography ===
Thomas Dworzak published a collection of "last portrait" photographs of young Taliban soldiers about to depart for the front, found in Kabul photo studios. The book, titled Taliban, attests to a campy aesthetic, quite close to the gay movement in California or a Peter Greenaway film.

=== Television ===
The Comedy Central television show Strangers with Candy (1999–2000), starring comedian Amy Sedaris, was a camp spoof of the ABC Afterschool Special genre. Inspired by the work of George Kuchar and his brother Mike Kuchar, ASS Studios began making a series of short, no-budget camp films. Their feature film Satan, Hold My Hand (2013) features many elements recognized in camp pictures.

Since 2000, the Eurovision Song Contest, an annually televised competition of song performers from different countries, has shown an increasing element of camp—since the contest has shown an increasing attraction within the LGBTQ+ communities—in their stage performances. This is especially true during the televised finale, which is screened live across Europe. As it is a visual show, many Eurovision performances attempt to attract the attention of voters through means other than the music, which sometimes leads to bizarre onstage gimmicks, and what some critics have called "the Eurovision kitsch drive", with almost cartoonish novelty acts performing.

=== Theatre ===
Andrew Holleran's 1988 book of essays, Ground Zero, includes an analysis of "smoldering anarchist of kitsch" Charles Ludlam—a theatre artist who produced what Garth Greenwell describes as "extravagant drag epics" with Ridiculous Theatrical Company, until his death of AIDS-related pneumonia in 1987. Greenwell writes: "Holleran's essay is the most concise and profound discussion of camp aesthetics I know."

The Australian theatre and opera director Barrie Kosky is renowned for his use of camp in interpreting the works of the Western canon, including Shakespeare, Wagner, Molière, Seneca and Kafka. His 2006 eight-hour production for the Sydney Theatre Company The Lost Echo was based on Ovid's Metamorphoses and Euripides's The Bacchae. In the first act ("The Song of Phaeton"), for instance, the goddess Juno takes the form of a highly stylized Marlene Dietrich, and the musical arrangements feature Noël Coward and Cole Porter. Kosky's use of camp is also effectively employed to satirize the pretensions, manners, and cultural vacuity of Australia's suburban middle class, which is suggestive of the style of Dame Edna Everage. For example, in The Lost Echo, Kosky employs a chorus of high school students: one girl in the chorus takes leave from the goddess Diana, and begins to rehearse a dance routine, muttering to herself in a broad Australian accent, "Mum says I have to practice if I want to be on Australian Idol."

In the UK, the music hall tradition of pantomime, which often uses drag and other features of camp, remains a popular form of entertainment for families and young children. Most towns and cities in the UK stage at least one pantomime between November and February, drawing in an estimated £146 million in 2014.

== Distinguishing between kitsch and camp ==
The words camp and kitsch are often used interchangeably, though they are distinct. Camp is rooted in a specifically queer sensibility, informed by queer identity and culture, whereas kitsch is rooted in the rise of mass-produced art and popular culture for the mainstream. Both terms may relate to an object or work that carries aesthetic value, but kitsch refers specifically to the work itself, whereas camp is a sensibility as well as a mode of performance. A person may consume kitsch intentionally or unintentionally, but camp, as Susan Sontag observed, is always a way of consuming or performing culture "in quotation marks".

Sontag also distinguishes between naïve and deliberate camp, and examines Christopher Isherwood's distinction between low camp—which he associated with cross-dressing and drag performances—and high camp—which included "the whole emotional basis of the Ballet, for example, and of course of Baroque art". High camp has also been used to describe drag that is more subtle or ironic, as opposed to drag that is more parodic and obvious (and thus low camp).

According to sociologist Andrew Ross, camp combines outmoded and contemporary forms of style, fashion, and technology. Often characterized by the reappropriation of a "throwaway Pop aesthetic", camp works to intermingle the categories of "high" and "low" culture. Objects may become camp objects because of their historical association with a power now in decline. As opposed to kitsch, camp reappropriates culture in an ironic fashion, whereas kitsch is indelibly sincere. Additionally, kitsch may be seen as a quality of an object, while camp "tends to refer to a subjective process". Those who identify objects as "camp" note the distance often apparent in the process through which "unexpected value can be located in some obscure or exorbitant object."

In its subversiveness and irony, camp can also suggest the possibility of overturning the status quo, making it a far more "radical spectacle" than kitsch. Musicologist Philip Brett has described camp as:

a strategy which confronts un-queer ontology [states of being] and homophobia with humor and which by those same means may also signal the possibility of the overturn of that ontology—as when, on a famous night in 1969, the evening of the funeral of Judy Garland, the mood of a group of gays and drag queens reveling in the spectacle of their own arrest by members of the New York City Vice Squad at the Stonewall Bar turned to one of rage and produced the event that solidified the lesbian and gay movement.

== See also ==
- Avant-garde
- Asemic writing
- Collection de l'art brut
- Glam rock
- Horror vacui
- Lille Métropole Museum of Modern, Contemporary and Outsider Art
- Lowbrow (art movement)
- Neo-pop
- Pop art
- Saving and Preserving Arts and Cultural Environments
- Surrealism
- Vernacular architecture

== Sources ==
- Babuscio, Jack (1993) "Camp and the Gay Sensibility" in Camp Grounds: Style and Homosexuality, David Bergman Ed., U of Massachusetts, Amherst ISBN 978-0-87023-878-9
- Feil, Ken (2005) "Queer Comedy", in Comedy: A Geographic and Historical Guide Vol. 2. pp. 19–38, 477–492, Maurice Charney Ed., Praeger, Westport, CN ISBN 978-0-313-32715-5
- Levine, Martin P. (1998) Gay Macho, New York UP, New York ISBN 0-8147-4694-2
- Meyer, Moe, Ed. (1994) The Politics and Poetics of Camp, Routledge, London and New York ISBN 978-0-415-08248-8
- Morrill, Cynthia (1994) "Revamping the Gay Sensibility: Queer Camp and dyke noir" (In Meyer pp. 110–129)
- Oates, Joyce Carol and Atwan, Robert. 2000. The Best American Essays of the Century. pp. 327–341. Joyce Carol Oates, editor, Robert Atwan co-editor. Houghton Mifflin Company, New York ISBN 978-0-618-15587-3
- Helene A. Shugart and Catherine Egley Waggoner (2008) Making Camp: Rhetorics of Transgression in U.S. Popular Culture, U of Alabama P., Tuscaloosa ISBN 978-0-8173-5652-1
- Van Leer, David (1995) The Queening of America: Gay Culture in Straight Society, Routledge, London and New York ISBN 978-0-415-90336-3
