= Styles of Radical Will =

1969 collection of essays by Susan Sontag

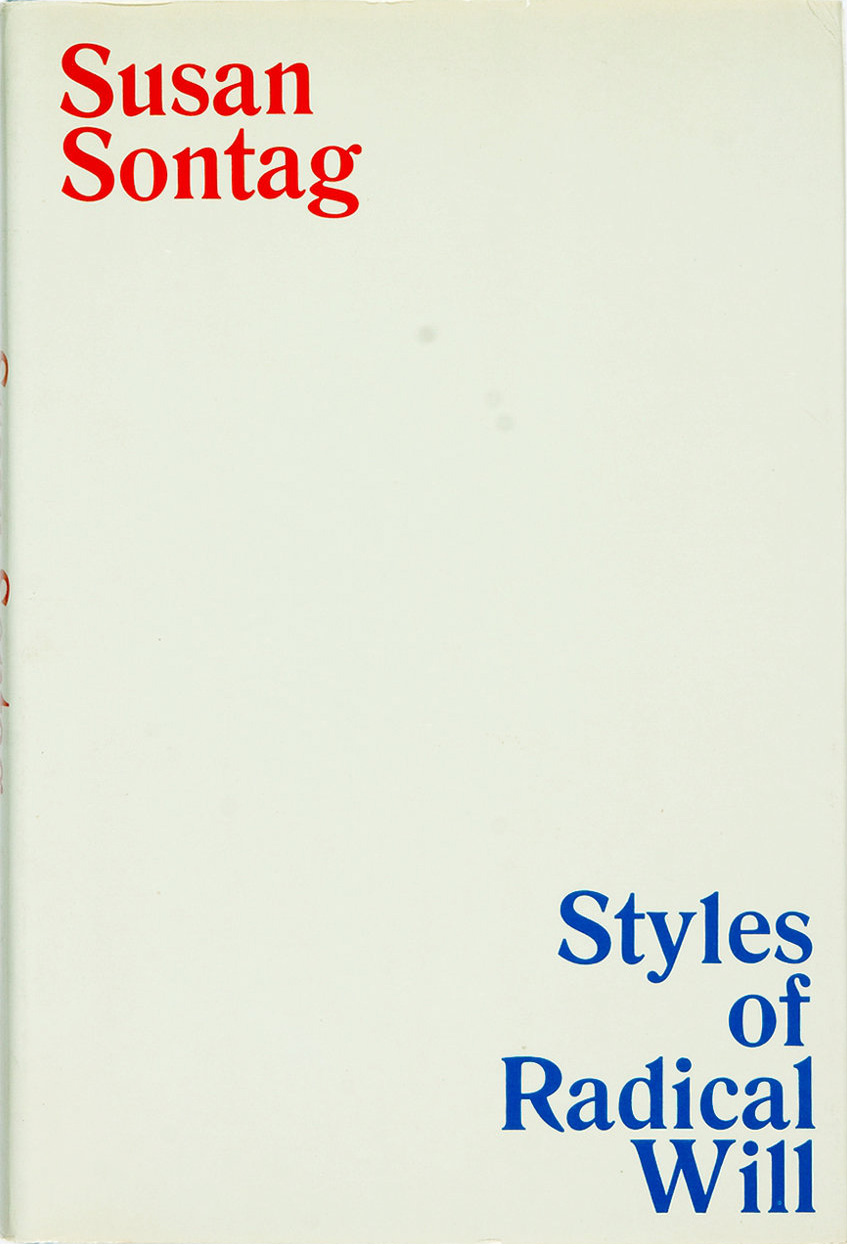
- First edition
- Author: Susan Sontag
- Language: English
- Subject: Criticism
- Publisher: Farrar, Straus and Giroux
- Publication date: 1969
- Publication place: United States
- Media type: Print
- Pages: 274
- ISBN: 0436478013

Styles of Radical Will is a collection of essays by Susan Sontag published in 1969. Among the subjects discussed are film, literature, politics, and pornography. It is Sontag's second collection of non-fiction after Against Interpretation, which was published in 1966. Most of the essays in this book were originally published in Aspen, Partisan Review, the Tulane Drama Review, Sight and Sound, and Esquire.

== Contents ==
I.

- "The Aesthetics of Silence"
  First appeared in Aspen in 1967.
- "The Pornographic Imagination" (1967)
  First appeared in Partisan Review in 1967.
- ""Thinking Against Oneself": Reflections on Cioran"
  Originally written as an introduction to the English translation of Emil Cioran's The Temptation to Exist in 1967.

II.

- "Theatre and Film"
  First appeared in The Tulane Drama Review in 1966.
- "Bergman's Persona"
  First appeared in Sight and Sound in 1967.
- "Godard"
  First appeared in Partisan Review in 1968.

III.

- "What's Happening in America"
  First appeared in Partisan Review in 1966.
- "Trip to Hanoi"
  First appeared in Esquire in 1968.

== Reception ==
Lawrence M. Bensky of The New York Times praised Styles of Radical Will as an "important book" and wrote, "It should be remembered that Miss Sontag has now written four of the most valuable intellectual documents of the past 10 years: 'Against Interpretation,' 'Notes on 'Camp',' 'The Aesthetics of Silence,' and 'Trip to Hanoi.' In the world in which she's chosen to live, she continues to be the best there is."
