= Christopher Isherwood and Don Bachardy (painting) =

1968 portrait by David Hockney

- Artist: David Hockney
- Year: 1968
- Medium: Acrylic on canvas
- Dimensions: 212 cm × 303.5 cm (83 in × 119.5 in)
- Location: Private collection

Christopher Isherwood and Don Bachardy is an acrylic on canvas portrait by the English artist David Hockney, from 1968. It is a joint depiction of the writer Christopher Isherwood and his partner, the painter Don Bachardy.

It was the first in a series of seven double portraits that Hockney executed between 1968 and 1975. It was part of a private collection for 40 years before its sale at auction at Christie's in New York City on 17 November 2025 for $44.3 million. It has been displayed at many of Hockney's retrospectives.

== Description ==
It is executed in acrylic paint on canvas. It measures 83.5 in × 119.5 in (2,120 mm × 3,040 mm).

The painting depicts Christopher Isherwood sitting alongside Don Bachardy on the right. The setting is the living room of the couple's house on Adelaide Drive in Santa Monica. Hockney had been introduced to Isherwood and Bachardy by Stephen Spender. Isherwood has four books stacked in front of him and Bachardy has three. A bowl of fruit "dominated by a massive banana" sits between the two piles of books. Christie's stated the objects depicted were arranged by Hockney to "heighten the picture's poise and rhythm" and not to represent cryptical allusions. Hockney recalled someone asking him " ... why there were four books in front of Don and only three books in front of Christopher. Was this because Don wasn’t as well-read and needed more? Amazing what people read into pictures. There are four books because I needed four to balance it out". Hockney took lots of photographs of the couple sitting together in preparation, and every time he said 'relax' Isherwood would sit with his foot over his knee and look at Bachardy who " ... never looked that way; he was always looking at me. So I thought, that's the pose it should be. And I began the picture".

Bachardy left for London for two months as Hockney began preparing to paint the portrait. Hockney worked from photographs of Bachardy leading Christie's to write that Bachardy's features were developed through "more slow, studied strokes" compared to Isherwood's "face figured with fresh immediacy".

== Criticism ==
The painting has been highly praised since its completion. Norman Rosenthal said that it was a "subtly yet deliberately and ambitiously conceived masterpiece" and a "precisely dramatic painting — a moment in time held here forever by one of the greatest painters of his time". Christie's described it as an "enduring story of intimacy and love" as it was "Suffused with tenderness and tension ... a masterpiece of human and pictorial drama that captures Hockney at the height of his powers".

Isherwood's biographer Katherine Bucknell wrote that the painting was a "domestic scene: two men at ease in their living room ... The viewer is inside their world, not a voyeur. The colors are pale and fresh, the light clean, with a quality of purity rather than anything the least bit shady, nocturnal, debauched, or even secretive. The surfaces are spartan, the composition stable, anchored by the piles of books. It's a confident, luminous portrayal of a same-sex relationship—quietly revolutionary". "In this masterpiece ... Hockney lends his flair for colour and form to capture California’s golden light, in a picture that distils the spirit of the times and immortalises the freedom of people to choose who to love and how to live".
