= Don Bachardy =

American painter (born 1934)

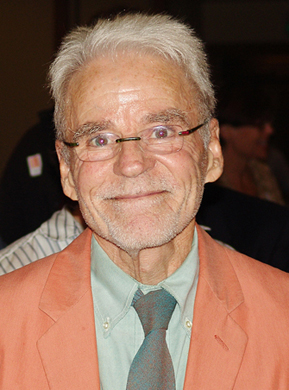
- Bachardy in 2004
- Born: Donald Jess Bachardy; May 18, 1934 (age 92); Los Angeles, California, US
- Known for: Portrait artist
- Partner: Christopher Isherwood (1953–1986, Isherwood's death)

Donald Jess Bachardy (/bəˈkɑːrdɪ/; born May 18, 1934) is an American portrait artist. He resides in Santa Monica, California. Bachardy was the partner of Christopher Isherwood for more than 30 years.

== Early life ==
Born in Los Angeles, California, Bachardy studied at the Chouinard Art Institute in Los Angeles and the Slade School of Art in London. His first one-man exhibition was held in October 1961 at the Redfern Gallery in London. He met the writer Christopher Isherwood on Valentine's Day 1953, when he was 18 and Isherwood was 48. They remained together until Isherwood's death in 1986. A number of paperback editions of Isherwood's novels feature Bachardy's pencil portraits of the author. A film about their relationship, titled Chris & Don: A Love Story, was released in 2008.

The artist David Hockney was introduced to the couple by the poet Stephen Spender. Hockney's 1968 portrait of Bachardy and Isherwood at their Santa Monica home was the first of seven Hockney painted in his series of double portraits. It sold for $44.3 million at auction in 2025.

== Work ==
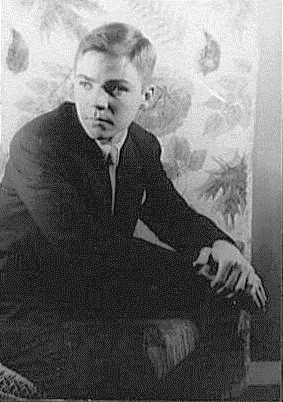
Bachardy, photographed by Carl Van Vechten in 1954

Bachardy has had many one-man exhibitions in Los Angeles, San Francisco, Seattle, Houston and New York City. More recently, he exhibited at the Huntington Library in San Marino, California, in 2004–2005, as well as a recent exhibit, Don Bachardy: A Life in Portraits, at the Huntington in summer 2025.

His works reside in the permanent collections of the Metropolitan Museum of Art in New York, the M.H. de Young Memorial Museum of Art in San Francisco, the University of Texas, Henry E. Huntington Library and Art Gallery, San Marino, California, the University of California, Los Angeles, the Fogg Art Museum of Harvard University, Princeton University, the Smithsonian Institution, and the National Portrait Gallery, London.

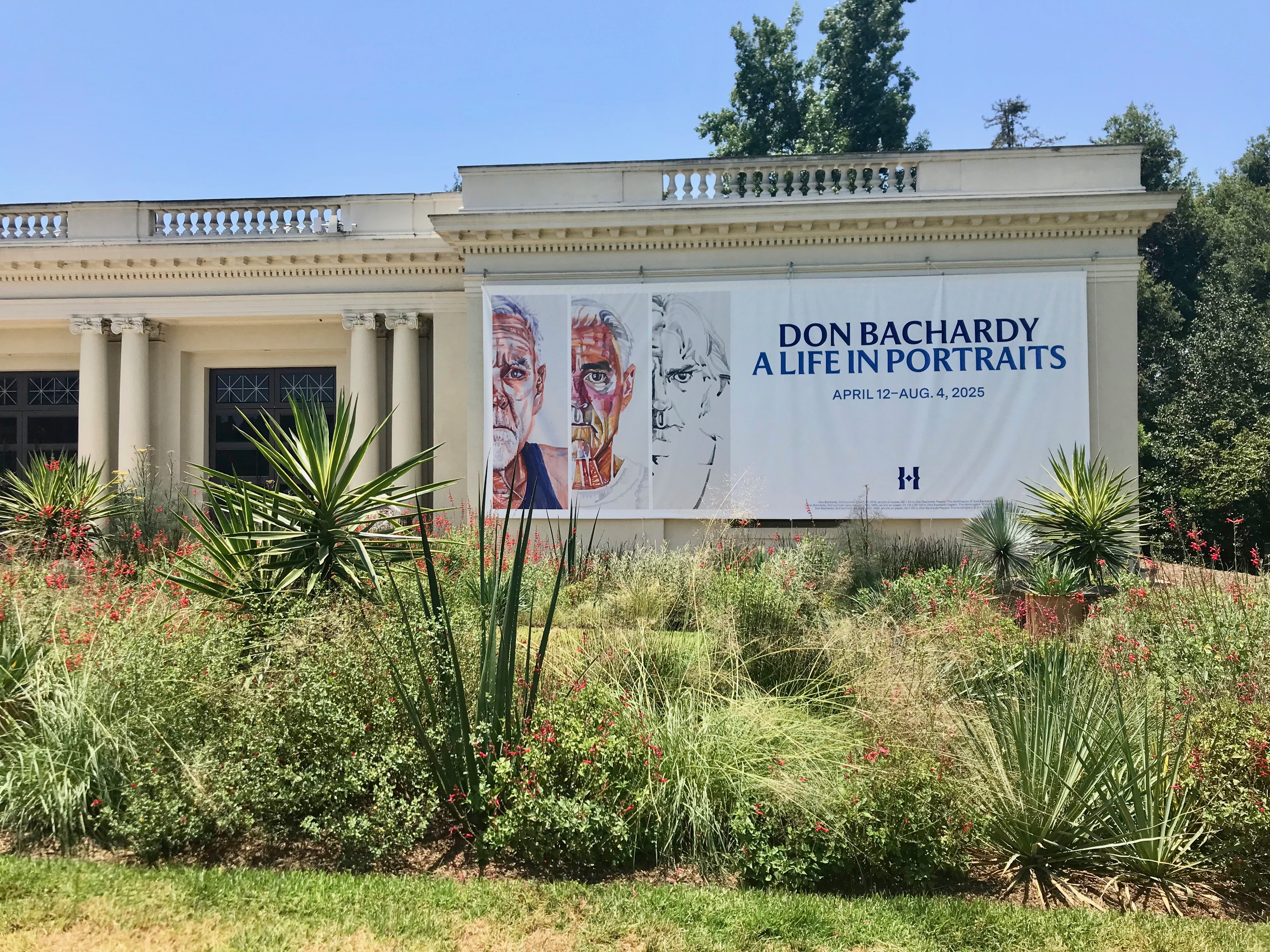
Bachardy's 2025 exhibition at the Huntington Library Museum & Gardens.

Six books of his work have been published. His life and works are also documented in Terry Sanders' film The Eyes of Don Bachardy. He collaborated with Isherwood on Frankenstein: The True Story (1973). His book Stars in My Eyes (2000), about celebrated people whom he had painted, became a number one best-seller in Los Angeles. Bachardy's most haunting and eloquent published collection, "Last Drawings of Christopher Isherwood" in 1990 contains the dying and deceased Isherwood for the last time in his eyes.

One of Bachardy's most notable works is the official gubernatorial portrait of Jerry Brown that hangs in the California State Capitol Museum.

Most recently, Bachardy made a cameo appearance in the movie A Single Man (starring Colin Firth) based on Isherwood's book of the same name; he portrays a professor in the teacher's lounge, to whom Firth says "Hello. Don." Bachardy told Angeleno Magazine in their December 2009 issue: "Chris got the idea for that book when he and I were having a domestic crisis. We'd been together 10 years. I was making a lot of trouble and wondering if I shouldn't be on my own. Chris was going through a very difficult period (as well). So he killed off my character, Jim, in the book and imagined what his life would be like without me."

In April 2025, a major retrospective of Bachardy's work, Don Bachardy: A Life in Portraits, went up at the Huntington Library. It featured over 100 works spanning 70 years' worth of the artist's career.

== Personal life ==
Bachardy still lives in his and Isherwood's Santa Monica home (his place of residence for over 50 years), where he paints portraits for gallery shows and on a commission basis. In January 2010, he showed a retrospective of self-portraits (from 1959 to 2009) at Craig Krull Gallery in Santa Monica. In the fall of 2011, Bachardy exhibited portraits made over the last 40 years depicting artists from Southern California, including Peter Alexander, Larry Bell, Billy Al Bengston, Robert Irwin, Ed Moses, and Ed Ruscha at Craig Krull Gallery in conjunction with the Getty initiative Pacific Standard Time. All 33 paintings were purchased by a New York collector on the board of the Whitney Museum.

== Works ==
- Frankenstein: The True Story. 1973 (with Christopher Isherwood)
- Don Bachardy: Drawings. Municipal Art Gallery, Barnsdall Park 1973
- October / O. Methuen, London 1983 (with Christopher Isherwood), ISBN 0-413-50040-3
- One Hundred Drawings. Twelvetrees Press, Los Angeles 1983
- 70 × 1 Drawings. Illuminati, 1983
- Drawings of the male nude (including Rick Sandford). Twelvetrees Press, Pasadena 1985, ISBN 0-942642-18-X
- Christopher Isherwood: Last drawings. Faber and Faber, London/Boston 1990, ISBN 0-571-14075-0 (mit John Russell, Stephen Spender)
- Short cuts: the screenplay. Capra Press, Santa Barbara 1993 (with Robert Altmann, Frank Barhydt), ISBN 0-88496-378-0
- Observant Eye: Portrait Drawings By Don Bachardy. Fine Arts Museums of San Francisco, 1996
- The Portrait. Imprenta Glorias, Los Angeles 1997 (with Gloria Stuart)
- Stars In My Eyes. University of Wisconsin Press, Madison 2000, ISBN 0-299-16730-5
- The Animals: Love Letters Between Christopher Isherwood and Don Bachardy, edited by Katherine Bucknell. Farrar, Straus and Giroux, New York 2014. ISBN 9780374105174
- Hollywood. Glitterati 2014, ISBN 978-0991341924
- Don Bachardy: Nudes. Craig Krull Gallery 2017, ISBN 978-0692843291

== Filmography ==
- Frankenstein: The True Story (TV Movie 1972 teleplay – writer, with Isherwood)
- The Rose Tattoo (1955 – Passenger in Back Seat of Car)
- Rich and Famous (1981 – Malibu Party Guest)
- Luck, Trust & Ketchup: Robert Altman in Carver Country (1993 documentary – himself)
- Chris & Don: A Love Story (2007 documentary – himself)
- Finding Lee Mullican (2008 documentary – himself)
- Huxley on Huxley (2009 documentary – himself)
- A Single Man (2009 film – professor)
- Christopher and His Kind (2011 TV movie – consultant)
- Hockney (2014 documentary – himself)
- Truman Capote: Enfant Terrible Der Amerikanischen Literatur (2016 TV Movie documentary – himself)

== See also ==
- Peter Parker, Isherwood: A Life (2004).
- Daniel Curzon, Remembering Christopher Isherwood and Don Bachardy. In: Harrington Gay Men's Fiction Quarterly, Volume 6 (2004), Issue 1.
- Lee Prosser, Isherwood, Bowles, Vedanta, Wicca, and Me, (2001), ISBN 0-595-20284-5.
