= Huxley on Huxley =

2009 documentary film

Huxley on Huxley is a 2009 documentary directed by Mary Ann Braubach, narrated by Peter Coyote and includes interviews with Laura Huxley, drummer John Densmore (whose band, The Doors, was named after Aldous Huxley’s 1954 book, The Doors of Perception), spiritual leader Ram Dass, Esalen co-founder Michael Murphy, artist Don Bachardy, philosopher Huston Smith and actor Nick Nolte, star of the adaptation of Aldous Huxley's 1955 novel The Genius and the Goddess. The film features archival footage of Aldous Huxley, Timothy Leary, Mike Wallace, and Igor Stravinsky, and photographs from Laura and Aldous Huxley’s personal collection, as well as other historical archives.

== History ==
Italian-born Laura Huxley, a teenage violin virtuoso, played for European royalty and made her American debut at Carnegie Hall before leaving the concert stage to become a renowned psychotherapist and author. In 1956, Laura married Aldous Huxley, a famous writer and prophet of the 20th century. His 1933 novel Brave New World had established him as an English literary giant. Laura was his muse but also tripped right alongside him. Together they explore the experiences of LSD and mescaline. These sessions helped spark the psychedelic movement of the 1960s. The Huxley home in the Hollywood Hills was a center of the west coast avant garde. Regulars at their Saturday luncheons included celebrities such as Orson Welles, Igor Stravinsky, George Cukor and Christopher Isherwood. Laura guided Aldous through the psychedelic sessions that inspired his final novel, Island. Aldous, in turn, encouraged Laura to become a psychotherapist and write her first book, You Are Not the Target, which became a national bestseller. In 1960, the Huxleys began experimenting with Dick Alpert (now Ram Dass) and Timothy Leary, from whom Aldous later split over his free wheeling approach to psychedelics. The following year, Aldous’s lectures at UC Berkeley on the Human Potential Movement became the inspiration for the founding of the Esalen Institute, a gathering place for developers of revolutionary ideas, transformative practices and innovative art forms.

== Cast/Crew ==
- Laura Huxley
- Don Bachardy
- Ram Dass
- Huston Smith
- John Densmore
- Michael Murphy
- Nick Nolte
- Piero Ferrucci
- Mike Wallace
- Herman Harvey
- Tim Leary
- Christopher Isherwood
- Gerald Heard
- Walter Cronkite
- Dana Sawyer
- David Dunaway
- Michael Frederick

== Press reviews ==
- "28 July 2010: Huxley on Huxley". Strange Attractor. 2010-07-28.
- Reed Johnson (2010-08-24). "'Huxley on Huxley's vibrant spirit - latimes". Articles.latimes.com.
- "Huxley on Huxley". Shepherdexpress.com. 2010-07-15.
