= Gubernatorial portrait of Jerry Brown =

1984 painting by Don Bachardy

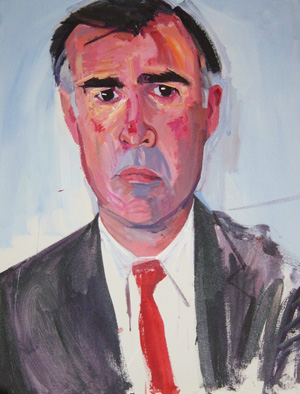
Portrait of Jerry Brown, Don Bachardy (1984)

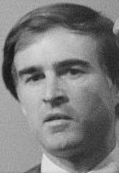
Brown at the 1976 Democratic National Convention in New York City

The first official gubernatorial portrait of Jerry Brown by portrait artist Don Bachardy was painted and unveiled in 1984. The painting commemorated American politician Jerry Brown's first two terms as Governor of California from 1975 to 1983 and has remained controversial since its unveiling.

== Style and execution ==
The painting diverged from the formal style that characterizes many official paintings of politicians. Brown said of his portrait that it looked "unfinished" and reflected his "unfinished work while in office." The Sacramento Bee, in an online guide to the California State Capitol said that "Between calm and conservative portraits of his peers, Brown's face peers out of gray bars and drips of red paint." Critics of the portrait described it as "abstract", "cubist" or "expressionistic", though as the authors of the United States Senate Catalogue of Fine Art wrote "Those are merely code words for ‘modern’—indicating not what Brown's portrait is, but what it is not", emphasizing the fact that the painting is not a classic, formal portrait.

The unfinished look of the painting was commented on by Bachardy himself—he said that it stemmed from his difficulty in "capturing" Brown during their five sittings. Of his technique Bachardy said, "Some people are restless and I have to get into their rhythm...I’ll just hope to get something essential. You boil it down to the most crucial parts of the face and get the living quality. And sometimes that essence can be achieved in just a few moments."

In his journal Stars in My Eyes, Bachardy wrote that he found it difficult working on the portrait because of Brown's "defensiveness" and apparent unease with the project. Bachardy said the sittings were "an ordeal for both of us and made me wish that I could find a way to get my kicks without suffering such stress." Each of the five sittings produced a portrait. It was not until the middle of the fifth and final sitting that Bachardy told Brown how difficult his restlessness was making the work. Brown expressed surprise but then transformed his sitting-style into one of co-operation and stillness to a degree that "nearly unnerved" the painter. The final portrait, called by Bachardy Jerry Brown V, was completed in about three hours on 2 February 1984. It was agreed to be the best of the five.

Bachardy was paid $13,000 ($39,000 today) for the portrait.

== Reception ==
California legislators described the portrait as looking like "spilled ketchup and soy sauce", referring to Bachardy's use of broad brush strokes for Brown's orange and red skin tones.

The portrait was intended to be hung on the first floor of the California State Capitol with the other gubernatorial portraits, but the Joint Rules Committee of California State Assembly voted that it be displayed on a third-floor stairwell, following an eight-minute debate. The Democratic California legislator Lou Papan said that the portrait was "very well done ... it captures a lot of the expressions we all remember", to which a fellow Democratic legislator sarcastically replied, "Yeah, like the warmth in his eyes." On the placing of the painting Bachardy remarked that "If you saw some of the paintings hanging in the Capitol, you'd see why I am not at all insulted that my portrait of Brown is not among them."
