= A Single Man (novel) =

1964 novel by Christopher Isherwood

- First edition (UK)
- Author: Christopher Isherwood
- Language: English
- Genre: Novel
- Publisher: Methuen (UK); Simon & Schuster (US)
- Publication date: 1964
- Publication place: United States
- Media type: Print (hardcover & paperback)
- Pages: 186
- OCLC: 171466

A Single Man is a 1964 novel by Christopher Isherwood. Set in Southern California in 1962, shortly after the Cuban Missile Crisis, it depicts one day in the life of George, a middle-aged Englishman who is a professor at a university in Los Angeles. The university is a possible allusion to California State University, Los Angeles (CSULA), where Isherwood taught for some time. The novel is also believed to be influenced by a crisis in his relationship with Don Bachardy.

In 2009, fashion designer Tom Ford directed a film adaptation of the novel, with additions made to the original plot in the screenplay by David Scearce and Ford. Ford also contributed a foreword to a re-release of the novel.

== Plot ==
58-year old George is still grieving after the recent death of his long-term partner, Jim. He is unable to cope with the despondent, bereaved nature of his existence. George goes through his day having various encounters with different people that colour his senses and illuminate the possibilities of being alive and human in the world.

At the university where he works as a lecturer, he discusses one of Aldous Huxley's books with the students. One of them, Kenny, strikes up a conversation with him after the lecture. The two walk to a bookshop where Kenny buys George a pencil sharpener as a gift. Later, George goes to a hospital to visit Doris, a woman with whom Jim once had a brief affair. Doris is dying of cancer; she is frail and not expected to live much longer. George goes to the gym and then visits his friend, a fellow English expatriate Charlotte. They have dinner and drink a lot.

George goes to The Starboard Side, a local pub. There, he encounters Kenny, who, it turns out, had come here expecting to see George. They drink and talk, flirting between the lines. Kenny suggests that they go for a swim and they both go in the sea naked. George suggests that they go to his place. There, they talk some more, but after a misunderstanding, George falls asleep and Kenny leaves his house. George wakes up, reads a friendly note that Kenny had left behind, and falls back asleep. The narrator then imagines, while commenting on the improbability of this happening on this particular day, the death of George and how his mind leaves his body behind.

== Characters ==
- George
- Jim
- Mr. Strunk
- Mrs. Strunk
- Mr. Garfein
- Mrs. Garfein
- Charlotte
- Kenny Potter
- Lois Yamaguchi
- Russ Dreyer
- Alexander Mong
- Tom Kugelman
- Buddy Sorensen
- Sister Maria
- Mr. Stoessel
- Mrs. Netta Torres
- Dr. Gottlieb
- Myron Hirsch
- Wally Bryant
- Estelle Oxford
- Grant Lefanu
- Cynthia Leach
- Andy Leach
- Doris
- Buck
- Rick
- Two young men playing tennis

== Censorship ==
In April 2025, the Lukashenko regime added the book to the List of printed publications containing information messages and materials, the distribution of which could harm the national interests of Belarus.
