= The Memorial (novel) =

1932 novel by Christopher Isherwood

- First edition
- Author: Christopher Isherwood
- Cover artist: John Banting
- Language: English
- Publisher: Hogarth Press
- Publication date: 1932
- Publication place: United Kingdom
- Pages: 294

The Memorial is a 1932 English novel by Christopher Isherwood. The novel tells the story of an English family's disintegration in the days following World War I. Isherwood's second published novel, this is the first of his works for which he adapted his own life experiences into his fiction.

The book was originally published by The Hogarth Press.

The book was parodied in the author's 1939 work, Goodbye to Berlin.

Rebecca Gordon wrote that with The Memorial Isherwood "truly begins his constructed analysis of the effects of the First World War, which is specifically linked to the loss of his father Frank."
