= Jack Babuscio =

American journalist (1937–1990)

Jack Babuscio (1937–1990) was an American journalist and activist who primarily lived in England.

== Early life ==
Jack Babuscio was born in New York, NY. His mother and father were Irish and Italian, respectively.

== Career ==
In the 1960s, after completing an undergraduate degree in history from Rutgers University, Babuscio moved to London to complete his master's and PhD in history. During the 1970s and 1980s, he worked as a film critic and a gay counselor. He was simultaneously a full-time teacher at the Kingsway Princeton College in London, lecturing on topics related to history and film.

In 1974, he began to write for the publication Gay News, which is where he published most of his film reviews. Babuscio's reviews were some of the first to take films by John Waters and other similar directors seriously. He remained with the publication until its closure in 1983. Afterwards, he continued to write for the Gay Times.

He is best known for his essay "Camp and the Gay Sensibility", an influential piece that provided an overview of cinematic camp. It posited an idea that camp is a "nexus of irony, aestheticism, theatricality and humor" and that it is specifically a "gay sensibility".

Babuscio also edited an influential work called We Speak for Ourselves.

=== "Camp and the Gay Sensibility" ===
Originally published in 1977, this highly influential work, often cited and republished, attempts to define the gay sensibility and to describe camp. Babuscio asserts that the gay sensibility is a creative energy that is formed out an awareness of the world based on social oppression. Given this fact, he believes that the gay sensibility responds to society's need to label and subsequently polarize people, which has resulted in camp. Despite acknowledging a difficulty in defining camp, given that it can be subjective, he emphasizes consistent features that are basic to camp, such as irony aestheticism, theatricality, and humor. Babuscio's essay addresses each feature individually, providing an understanding of the typical elements of camp, and then goes on to illustrate these concepts by including examples like Rainer Werner Fassbinder's The Bitter Tears of Petra von Kant, the films of Josef von Sternberg, and films based on Tennessee Williams' work.

=== We Speak for Ourselves ===
This work represents Babuscio's experiences in counseling, gathering transcripts and case histories. It "represents a landmark contribution to gay self-understanding and acceptance" and is regarded as an important piece both politically and as a resource for other counselors.

The book received the 1977 Gay News Book Award. Additionally, New Society described the work as "a mosaic of self-told case histories" that "speaks very powerfully as the authentic voice of an oppressed minority", and added that Babuscio "presents his testimony with great intelligence and subtlety".

=== European Political Facts 1648–1789 ===
With his partner, Richard Dunn, Babuscio published European Political Facts 1648–1789. This book derived from Babuscio and Dunn's academic background in history, and it included information on heads of state, key ministers, political chronology, and other historical facts of the period.

== Personal life ==
During his time in London, Babuscio met fellow American Richard Dunn, a teacher from Mississippi. The two considered themselves anglophiles and first met at the British Museum. The couple lived together in England for twenty years. On January 11, 1990, Jack Babuscio died at the age of 52. He died from Kaposi's sarcoma and internal bleeding as a result of HIV/AIDS, a fact that Babuscio and Dunn both wanted publicly known to lessen the stigma around the disease.
