= The World in the Evening =

1954 novel by Christopher Isherwood

- First edition
- Author: Christopher Isherwood
- Language: English
- Publisher: Methuen
- Publication date: 1954
- Publication place: United Kingdom
- Media type: Print (Hardback & Paperback)
- Pages: 333

The World in the Evening by Christopher Isherwood is a quasi-fictional account of love, loss, and regret. As in many Isherwood novels, the main character is caught in a contest between his personal egoism and the needs of friends and lovers.

== Structure ==
The novel is narrated in the first person by the protagonist, Stephen Monk, whose experiences are broken into three sections: An End, Letters and Life, and A Beginning. Monk frequently experiences flashbacks triggered by other characters or by the letters of his deceased wife, Elizabeth.

== Plot introduction ==
Marital problems cause Stephen Monk to return to his birthplace, near Philadelphia, where he undergoes a period of cathartic introspection. Though he is a member of the American jeunesse dorée, he is an emotional and observant man, and the novel chronicles his search for love.

== Characters ==
- Monk is a typical Isherwood protagonist, in that he is self-absorbed, emotionally indiscriminate, and handsome.
- Elizabeth Rydell is Monk’s first wife, and author of books including one titled The World in the Evening.
- Jane Armstrong is Monk’s second wife.
- Aunt Sarah is a Quaker who is an old friend of Monk's family, an aunt by adoption rather than by blood.
- Gerda Mannheim, in her late 20s, is a refugee from Nazi Germany.
- Peter is Gerda’s husband, feared dead in Germany, though in fact he has escaped.
- Charles Kennedy and Bob Wood are lovers; Bob discusses pacifism with Monk.
- Alexander Stives is a friend of Elizabeth whom Monk sees as a competitor for Elizabeth’s love.
- Michael Drummond is an 18-year-old orphan raised by his Scottish uncle. He becomes Monk's lover.
- Martha Chance, and Mr. and Mrs. Harper, are Quaker friends of Aunt Sarah.
- Mary Scriven is a friend of Elizabeth Rydell, and a recipient of some of her letters.
- Mr. Frosch is Monk’s lawyer.
- Cecilia de Limbour, Elizabeth’s sister, is another recipient of letters from her.
- Warren Geiger is an American Monk meets at university.
- Marie is a woman whom Monk picks up in France, and who becomes his sexual tutor.
- Anette is a friend of Marie’s whom Monk dates briefly.
- Trude gives Monk gonorrhea.
- "Adrian" was Elizabeth’s name for Monk.
- Terrence Storrs and Isabel are characters in Elizabeth’s novel The World in the Evening.
- Mariano Galdos is Elizabeth’s lover and a character in the novel named Gurian.
- Mary Scriven is another of Elizabeth's correspondents.
- A German doctor performs emergency surgery on Elizabeth in Greece.
- Lee, Dale, Ben, Jo, Joyce, Glen, and Pierre are friends of Jane's.
- Henri was Michael’s best friend, killed in the war .
- Shirley is a friend of Jane’s who introduces herself to Monk.
- Martin Gates is a friend of Jane's whom Monk suspects of being the real father of their child.

== Camp ==
In Notes on "Camp", Susan Sontag refers to this novel’s passage regarding the concept of "camp":

Apart from a lazy two-page sketch in Christopher Isherwood's novel The World in the Evening (1954), [the idea of “camp"] has hardly broken into print.

In the novel two characters are discussing the meaning of camp, both High and Low. Charles Kennedy, a friend of the protagonist, says:

You thought it meant a swishy little boy with peroxided hair, dressed in a picture hat and a feather boa, pretending to be Marlene Dietrich? Yes, in queer circles they call that camping. … You can call [it] Low Camp…High Camp is the whole emotional basis for ballet, for example, and of course of baroque art … High Camp always has an underlying seriousness. You can't camp about something you don't take seriously. You're not making fun of it, you're making fun out of it. You're expressing what’s basically serious to you in terms of fun and artifice and elegance. Baroque art is basically camp about religion. The ballet is camp about love …

Then examples are given: Mozart, El Greco and Dostoevsky are camp; Beethoven, Flaubert and Rembrandt are not.

== Influence ==
The composer Nicholas Maw's 1988 orchestral composition The World in the Evening acknowledges Isherwood's novel as supplying the title for the piece, but there is no other narrative connection.

== Book reviews ==
- Another look book
