= Against Interpretation =

1966 collection of essays by Susan Sontag

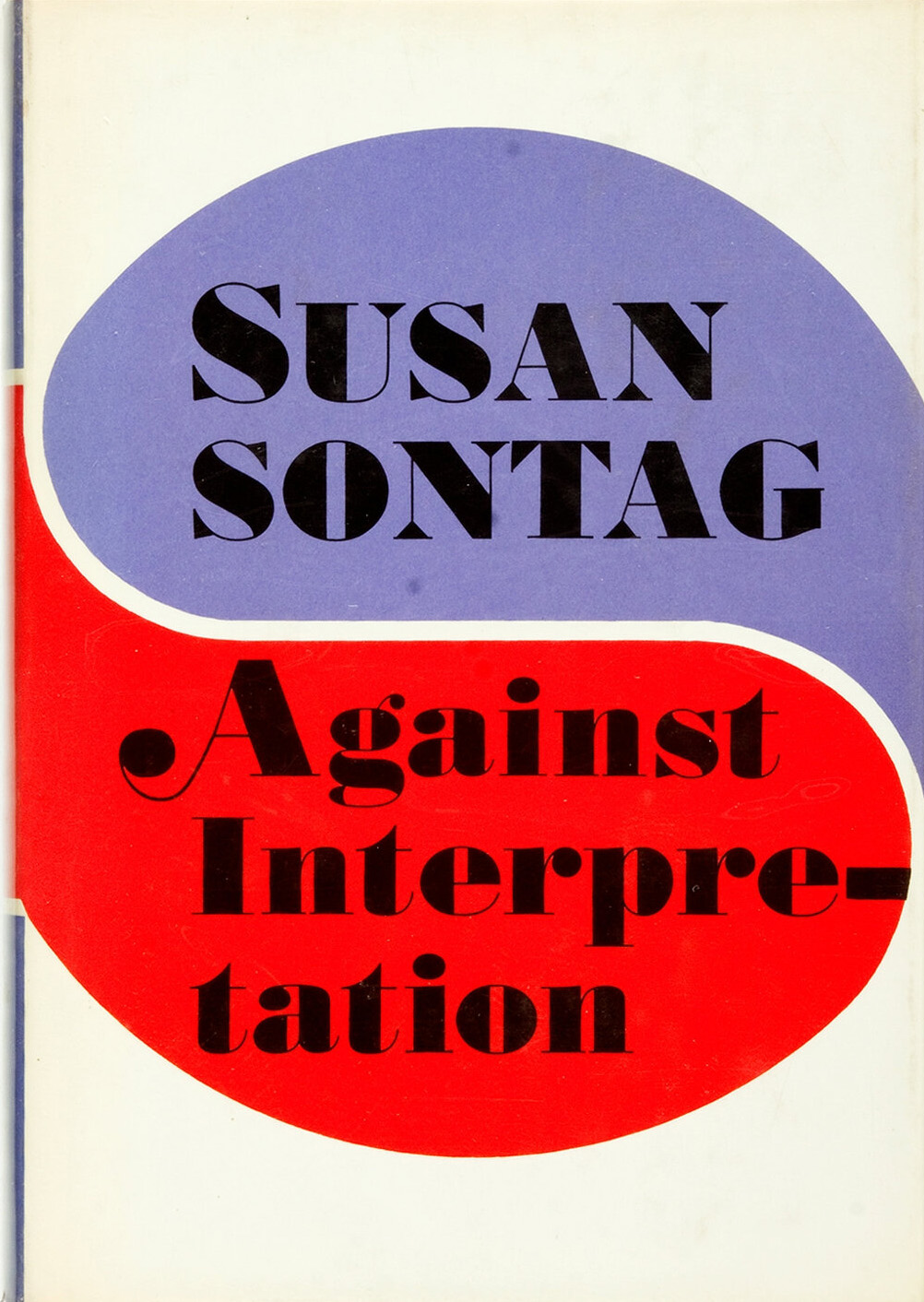
- First edition
- Author: Susan Sontag
- Cover artist: Ellen Raskin
- Language: English
- Subject: Criticism
- Publisher: Farrar, Straus and Giroux
- Publication date: 1966
- Publication place: United States
- Media type: Print
- Pages: 304
- ISBN: 978-0374520403
- OCLC: 171772

Against Interpretation (often published as Against Interpretation and Other Essays) is a 1966 collection of essays by Susan Sontag. It includes some of Sontag's best-known works, including "Notes on 'Camp'", "On Style" and the eponymous essay "Against Interpretation." In the latter, Sontag argues that the new approach to criticism and aesthetics neglects the sensuous impact and novelty of art, instead fitting works into predetermined intellectual interpretations and emphasis on the "content" or "meaning" of a work. The book was a finalist for the Arts and Letters category of the National Book Award.

== Titular essay ==
"Against Interpretation" is Sontag's influential essay in Against Interpretation and Other Essays, which discusses the divisions between two different kinds of art criticism and theory: formalist interpretation and content-based interpretation. Sontag is strongly averse to what she considers to be contemporary interpretation, that is, an overabundance of importance placed upon the content or meaning of an artwork rather than being keenly alert to the sensuous aspects of a given work and developing a descriptive vocabulary for how it appears and how it does whatever it does. She believes that interpretation of the modern style has a particular "taming" effect: reducing the freedom of a subjective response and placing limitations or certain rules upon a responder. The modern style of interpretation is particularly despised by Sontag in relation to the previous classical style of interpretation that sought to "bring artworks up to date", to meet modern interests and apply allegorical readings. Where this type of interpretation was seen to resolve conflict between past and present by revamping an art work and maintaining a certain level of respect and honour, Sontag believes that the modern style of interpretation has lost sensitivity and rather strives to "excavate...destroy" a piece of art.

Sontag asserts that the modern style is quite harmful to art and to audiences alike; enforcing hermeneutics – fallacious, complicated "readings" that seem to engulf an artwork, to the extent that analysis of content begins to degrade, to destroy. Reverting to a more primitive and sensual, almost magical experience of art is what Sontag desires; even though that is quite impossible due to the thickened layers of hermeneutics that surround interpretation of art and that have grown to be recognised and respected. Sontag challenges Marxian and Freudian theories, claiming they are "aggressive and impious".

Sontag also refers to the contemporary world as one of "overproduction... material plentitude" where one's physical senses have been dulled and annihilated by mass production and complex interpretation to the extent that appreciation of the form of art has been lost. To Sontag, modernity means a loss of sensory experience and she believes (in corroboration with her theory of the damaging nature of criticism) that the pleasure of art is diminished by such overload of the senses. In this way, Sontag asserts that inevitably, the modern style of interpretation separates form and content in a manner that damages an artwork and one's own sensorial appreciation of a piece.

Though she claims that interpretation can be "stifling", making art comfortable and "manageable" and thus degrading the artist's original intention, Sontag equally presents a solution to the dilemma she sees as an abundance of interpretation on content. That is, to approach art works with a strong emphasis on form, to "reveal the sensuous surface of art without mucking about in it."

The essay was first published in Volume 8, number 34 of Evergreen Review in December 1964. The literary critic Benjamin Libman has argued that "Against Interpretation" was a re-writing of similar, anti-hermeneutic arguments put forward by the French New Novelist Alain Robbe-Grillet in the 1950s. Robbe-Grillet's support for a "poetics of presence" over hermeneutic literature appeared in a series of that were eventually collected in a single volume, For a New Novel, in 1963.

== Contents ==
The 26 pieces in Against Interpretation are divided into five sections.

I.

- "Against Interpretation" (1964)
- "On Style" (1965)

II.

- "The artist as exemplary sufferer" (1962)
- "Simone Weil" (1963)
- “Camus' Notebooks" (1963)
- "Michel Leiris' Manhood" (1964)
- "The anthropologist as hero" (1963)
- "The literary criticism of Georg Lukac" (1965)
- "Sartre's Saint Genet" (1963)
- "Nathalie Sarraute and the novel" (1963; revised 1965)

III.

- "Ionesco" (1964)
- "Reflections on The Deputy" (1964)
- "The death of tragedy" (1963)
- "Going to theater, etc." (1964)
- "Marat / Sade / Artaud" (1965)

IV.

- "Spiritual style in the films of Robert Bresson" (1964)
- "Godard's Vivre Sa Vie'' (1964)
- "The imagination of disaster" (1965)
- "Jack Smith's Flaming Creatures (1964)
- "Resnais' Muriel" (1963)
- "A note on novels and films" (1961)

V.

- "Piety without content" (1961)
- "Psychoanalysis and Norman O. Brown's Life Against Death" (1961)
- "Happenings: an art of radical juxtaposition" (1962)
- "Notes on 'Camp'" (1964)
- "One culture and the new sensibility" (1965)

== Reception ==
In a contemporary review of the book, Benjamin DeMott of The New York Times praised Against Interpretation as "a vivid bit of living history here and now, and at the end of the sixties it may well rank among the invaluable cultural chronicles of these years." He concluded, "Miss Sontag has written a ponderable, vivacious, beautifully living and quite astonishingly American book." Brandon Robshaw of The Independent later observed, "This classic collection of essays and criticism from the 1960s flatters the reader's intelligence without being intimidating." He added, "...the essays are unfailingly stimulating. Though they bear the stamp of their time, Sontag was remarkably prescient; her project of analysing popular culture as well as high culture, the Doors as well as Dostoevsky, is now common practice throughout the educated world. And the artists and intellectuals she discusses—Nietzsche, Camus, Godard, Barthes etc—demonstrate that she knew which horses to back."

In their introduction to Critique and Postcritique (2017), Rita Felski and Elizabeth S. Anker argue that the title essay from Sontag's collection has played an important role in the field of postcritique, a movement within literary criticism and cultural studies that attempts to find new forms of reading and interpretation that go beyond the methods of critique, critical theory, and ideological criticism.
