= Katherine Bucknell =

American scholar and novelist

Katherine Bucknell (born 1957 in Saigon) is an American scholar and novelist who resides in England.

Katherine Bucknell is the editor of W. H. Auden's Juvenilia and of three volumes of the diaries of Christopher Isherwood, as well as The Animals: Love Letters Between Christopher Isherwood and Don Bachardy. In 2024, Bucknell published the biography Christopher Isherwood: Inside Out (Chatto & Windus).

She is the author of four novels: Canarino (2004), Leninsky Prospekt (2005), What You Will (2007), and +1 (2013).
