= A Single Man =

2009 film by Tom Ford

- Theatrical release poster
- Directed by: Tom Ford
- Screenplay by: Tom Ford; David Scearce
- Based on: A Single Man by Christopher Isherwood
- Produced by: Tom Ford; Andrew Miano; Robert Salerno; Chris Weitz
- Starring: Colin Firth; Julianne Moore; Matthew Goode; Nicholas Hoult
- Cinematography: Eduard Grau
- Edited by: Joan Sobel
- Music by: Abel Korzeniowski
- Production companies: Artina Films; Depth of Field; Fade to Black
- Distributed by: The Weinstein Company (United States and Germany); IM Global (International)
- Release dates: September 11, 2009 (Venice); December 11, 2009 (United States)
- Running time: 100 minutes
- Country: United States
- Language: English
- Budget: $7 million
- Box office: $25 million

A Single Man is a 2009 American period romantic drama film based on the 1964 novel by Christopher Isherwood. The directorial debut of fashion designer Tom Ford, the film stars Colin Firth, who was nominated for the Academy Award for Best Actor for his portrayal of George Falconer, a depressed gay British university professor living in Southern California in 1962.

The film premiered on September 11, 2009, at the 66th Venice International Film Festival, where Firth won the Volpi Cup for Best Actor, and went on the film festival circuit. After it screened at the 34th Toronto International Film Festival, The Weinstein Company picked it up for distribution in the United States and Germany. An initial limited run in the United States commenced on December 11, 2009, to qualify it for the 82nd Academy Awards with a wider release in early 2010.

== Plot ==
On November 30, 1962, a month after the Cuban Missile Crisis, George Falconer is a middle-aged English college professor living in Los Angeles. George dreams that he encounters the body of his longtime partner, Jim, at the scene of the car accident that took Jim's life eight months earlier. He bends down to kiss his dead lover. After awakening, George delivers a voiceover discussing the pain and depression he has endured since Jim's death and his intention to end his life that evening.

George receives a phone call from his dearest friend, Charley, who projects lightheartedness despite also being miserable. George goes about his day putting his affairs in order and focusing on the beauty of isolated events, believing he is seeing things for the last time. At times, he recalls his sixteen-year-long relationship with Jim.

During the school day, George comes into contact with a student, Kenny Potter, who shows interest in George and disregards conventional boundaries of student–professor discussion. George also forms an unexpected connection with a Spanish male prostitute, Carlos. That evening, George meets Charley for dinner. Though they initially reminisce and amuse themselves by dancing, Charley's desire for a deeper relationship with George and her failure to understand his relationship with Jim angers George.

George goes to a bar and discovers that Kenny has followed him. They get a round of drinks, go skinny dipping, and then return to George's house and continue drinking. George passes out and wakes up in bed with Kenny asleep in another room. While watching Kenny, George discovers that he has fallen asleep holding George's gun to keep George from killing himself. George locks the gun away, burns his suicide notes and in a voiceover explains that he has rediscovered the ability "to feel, rather than think". As he makes peace with his grief, George suffers a heart attack and dies, while envisioning Jim appearing and kissing him.

== Cast ==
- Colin Firth as George Falconer
- Julianne Moore as Charlotte "Charley" Roberts
- Nicholas Hoult as Kenny Potter
- Matthew Goode as Jim
- Jon Kortajarena as Carlos
- Paulette Lamori as Alva
- Ryan Simpkins as Jennifer Strunk
- Ginnifer Goodwin as Mrs. Strunk
- Teddy Sears as Mr. Strunk
- Paul Butler as Christopher Strunk
- Aaron Sanders as Tom Strunk
- Lee Pace as Grant Lefanu
- Erin Daniels as Bank Teller
- Aline Weber as Lois

Jon Hamm has an uncredited voice cameo as Jim's cousin Harold Ackerly, who calls George to tell him of Jim's death and that the funeral is "just for family."

== Production ==
Fashion designer Tom Ford, as a first-time director, financed the film himself. The film places emphasis on the culture of the 1960s; the production design is by the same team that designed AMC television's Mad Men, which is set in the same era. The actual house where the character George lives in the film was designed in 1948 by John Lautner, his first house after leaving Frank Lloyd Wright. The film was shot in 21 days (from 3 November to 5 December 2008), according to "The Making of A Single Man", a featurette included on the DVD release of the film.

== Marketing controversy ==
An early theatrical poster for A Single Man featured a close-up shot of Colin Firth and Julianne Moore lying side by side, their arms and shoulders touching. This led to speculation that the work's gay content and themes were being deleted or diminished in its marketing materials to improve its chances of success with a wider audience. A new poster with Moore relocated to the background was issued. The film's original trailer placed more emphasis on the relationship between George and Jim but a re-cut trailer omitted a shot of George and Jim kissing while retaining a kiss between George and Charley. Also deleted were shots of George meeting hustler Carlos outside a liquor store, George and Kenny running nude into the ocean, and a shot of George staring into a male student's eyes, while keeping a shot of George staring into the eyes of a female student.

Speaking of the controversy, Moore said that director Tom Ford expressed concern that the original poster made the film appear to be a romantic comedy and that he ordered that the poster be changed. However Ford, noting he does not see the film in terms of gay or straight, said, "I don't think the movie's been de-gayed. I have to say that we live in a society that's pretty weird. For example, you can have full-frontal male nudity on HBO, yet in cinema, you can't have naked male buttocks. You can't have men kissing each other without it being considered adult content. So, in order to cut a trailer that can go into broad distribution in theaters, certain things had to be edited out. But it wasn't an intentional attempt to remove the gayness of the movie." Conversely, Colin Firth said, "[The marketing] is deceptive. I don't think they should do that because there's nothing to sanitize. It's a beautiful story of love between two men and I see no point in hiding that. People should see it for what it is." Harvey Weinstein would only say, when asked about marketing a gay romance, "Brokeback Mountain did pretty well. Midnight Cowboy did pretty well. If you know how to market, you can market. There's an audience for it." When pressed about the poster, Weinstein cut off the interview, saying, "I'm good. You got enough. Thank you." Peter Knegt of IndieWire suggested that The Weinstein Company "de-gayed" the trailer to better the film's chances of receiving Academy Award nominations.

== Reception ==
=== Critical response ===
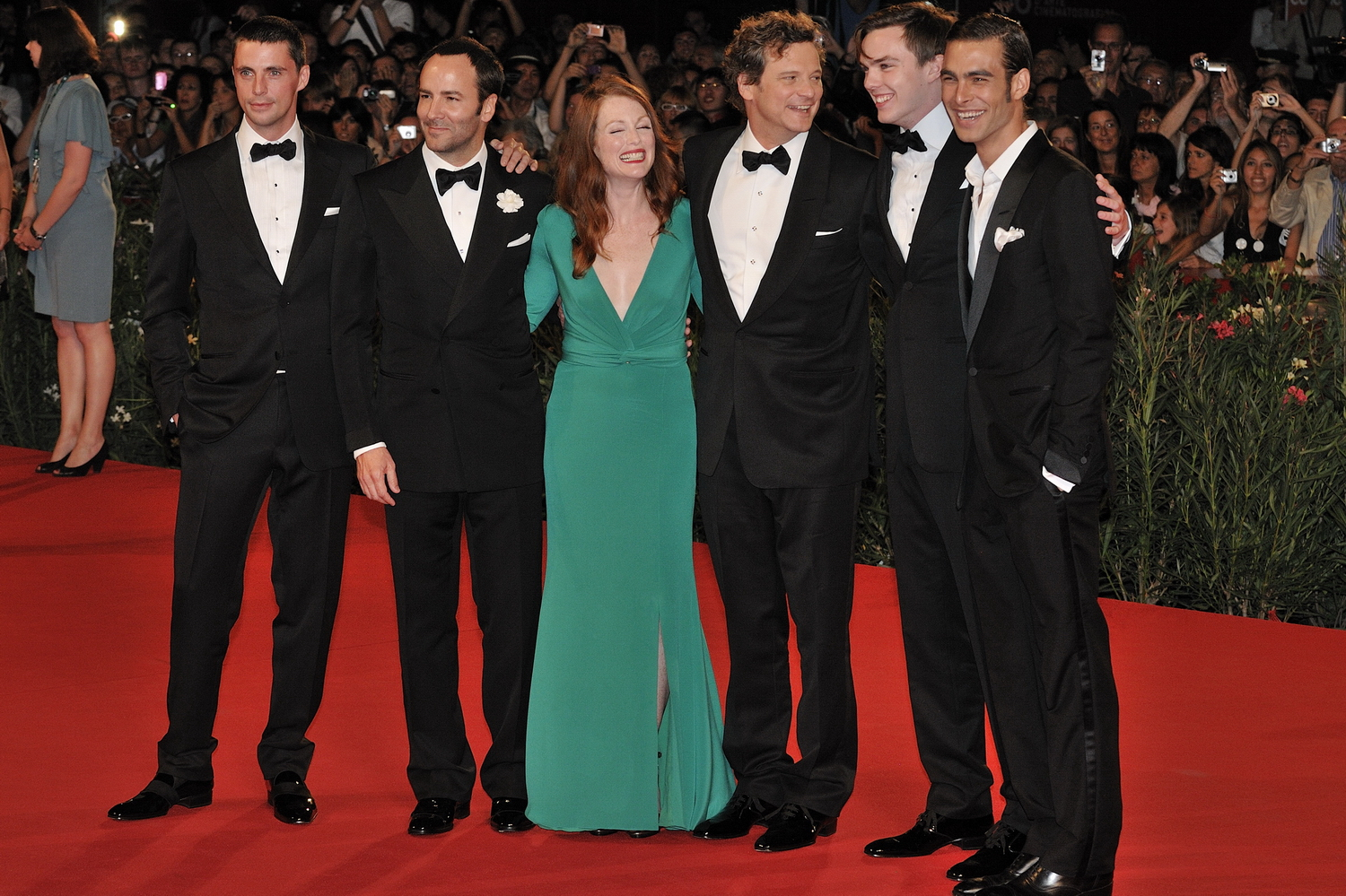
Red carpet with Matthew Goode, Tom Ford, Julianne Moore, Colin Firth, Nicholas Hoult and Jon Kortajarena at 66th Venice Film Festival.

A Single Man has received an overall positive reception from critics, with most reviews singling out Colin Firth's performance. It currently holds an 86% "Fresh" rating on Rotten Tomatoes, based on 192 reviews, and an average rating of 7.4/10, with the site's consensus being: "Though the costumes are beautiful and the art direction impeccable, what stands out most from this debut by fashion designer Tom Ford is the leading performance by Colin Firth." Metacritic has compiled an average score of 77 (generally favorable reviews) from 35 critic reviews.

Michael Phillips of the Chicago Tribune wrote: "Some films aren't revelations, exactly, but they burrow so deeply into old truths about love and loss and the mess and thrill of life, they seem new anyway". Bob Mondello of NPR commented: "An exquisite, almost sensual grief suffuses every frame of A Single Man." Marc Savlov of The Austin Chronicle wrote: "Everything fits perfectly, from titles to fin, but most of all Colin Firth, who dons the role of George like a fine bespoke suit."

Critics who liked the film include The A.V. Club film critic Nathan Rabin, who gave the film an A− score, arguing: "A Single Man is a film of tremendous style wedded to real substance, and rooted in Firth's affecting lead performance as a man trying to keep it together for one last day after his world has fallen apart." Critic Roger Ebert of the Chicago Sun-Times also praised Firth, saying that he "plays George superbly, as a man who prepares a face to meet the faces that he meets. He betrays very little emotion, and certainly his thoughts cannot be read in his eyes."

The Times newspaper of London called the film "a thing of heart-stopping beauty . . . There will be critics who will be unable to get past the director's background, but rest assured: Tom Ford is the real deal." Variety's verdict: "Luminous and treasurable, despite its imperfections. An impressive helming debut for fashion designer Tom Ford."

== Accolades ==
The film was nominated for the Golden Lion at the 66th Venice International Film Festival and won the festival's third annual Queer Lion; Colin Firth was awarded the Volpi Cup for Best Actor at the film festival for his performance in the film. He also received the BAFTA Award for Best Actor in a Leading Role. Additionally, Firth received nominations at the Golden Globe Awards, the Screen Actors Guild Awards, and the Academy Awards. For her performance, Julianne Moore was nominated for the Golden Globe Award for Best Supporting Actress – Motion Picture.

Abel Korzeniowski was nominated for the Golden Globe Award for Best Original Score. Arianne Phillips was nominated for the BAFTA Award for Best Costume Design.

The film received the Grand Prix from the Belgian Syndicate of Cinema Critics. It also won the GLAAD Media Award for Outstanding Film – Wide Release and was named the AFI's Film of the Year.

== Soundtrack ==
The official soundtrack was released by Silva Screen Records on December 22, 2009. The tracklist consisted of original music composed by Abel Korzeniowski, operatic arias by Shigeru Umebayashi, as well as songs featured in the film.
