= Notes on "Camp" =

1964 essay by Susan Sontag

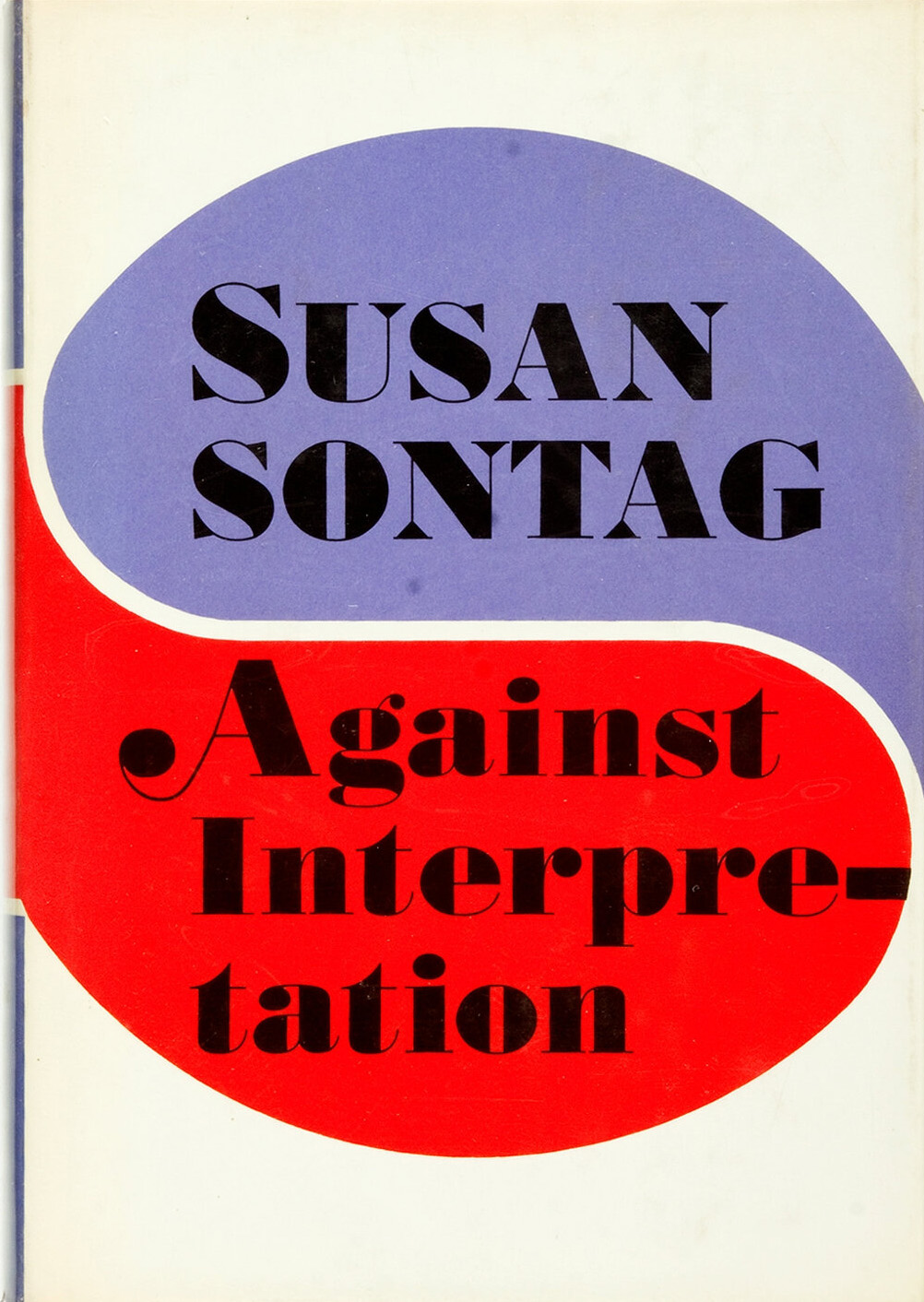
The cover of Against Interpretation (1966), which contains Sontag's essay

"Notes on 'Camp'" is a 1964 essay by Susan Sontag that brought the aesthetic sensibility known as "camp" to mainstream consciousness.

The essay was included in The Best of Essays of the Century (2000) co-edited by Robert Atwan with an introduction by editor Joyce Carol Oates. Oates characterizes "On Camp" as "both opinion essay and cultural criticism of a high order."

== Background ==
"Notes on 'Camp'" was first published as an essay in December 1964, and was her first contribution to the Partisan Review. The essay attracted interest in Sontag.

The essay was republished in 1966 in Sontag's debut collection of essays, Against Interpretation. The essay considers meanings and connotations of the word "camp".

== Synopsis ==
In note no. 4, Sontag offers a representative list of items she considers "camp":

- Zuleika Dobson
- Tiffany lamps
- Scopitone films
- The Brown Derby restaurant on Sunset Boulevard in LA
- The Enquirer, headlines and stories
- Aubrey Beardsley drawings
- Swan Lake
- Bellini's operas
- Visconti's direction of Salome and 'Tis Pity She's a Whore
- certain turn-of-the-century picture postcards
- Schoedsack's King Kong
- the Cuban pop singer La Lupe
- Lynd Ward's novel in woodcuts Gods' Man
- old Flash Gordon comics
- women's clothes of the twenties (feather boas, fringed and beaded dresses, etc.)
- the novels of Ronald Firbank and Ivy Compton-Burnett
- stag movies seen without lust

Fifty-eight "notes" constitute the body of the essay and are dedicated to playwright and social critic Oscar Wilde. The notes, numbered consecutively, are interspersed with epigrams from Wilde's writings.

Christopher Isherwood is mentioned in Sontag's essay: "Apart from a lazy two-page sketch in Christopher Isherwood's novel The World in the Evening (1954), [camp] has hardly broken into print." In Isherwood's novel two characters are discussing the meaning of camp, both High and Low. Stephen Monk, the protagonist, says:

You thought it meant a swishy little boy with peroxided hair, dressed in a picture hat and a feather boa, pretending to be Marlene Dietrich? Yes, in queer circles they call that camping. … You can call [it] Low Camp…High Camp is the whole emotional basis for ballet, for example, and of course of baroque art … High Camp always has an underlying seriousness. You can't camp about something you don't take seriously. You're not making fun of it, you're making fun out of it. You're expressing what’s basically serious to you in terms of fun and artifice and elegance. Baroque art is basically camp about religion. The ballet is camp about love …

Then examples are given: Mozart, El Greco and Dostoevsky are camp; Beethoven, Flaubert and Rembrandt are not.

== Legacy ==
The 2019 haute couture art exhibit Camp: Notes on Fashion, presented by the Anna Wintour Costume Center at New York City's Metropolitan Museum of Art, was built around Sontag's essay by Andrew Bolton, the Wendy Yu Curator in Charge of the Costume Institute.

== See also ==
- Kitsch
- Gay culture
- High culture
- Low culture
- Cinephilia

== Sources ==
- Oates, Joyce Carol and Atwan, Robert. 2000. The Best American Essays of the Century. pp. 327-341. Joyce Carol Oates, editor, Robert Atwan co-editor. Houghton Mifflin Company, New York ISBN 978-0-618-15587-3
