= Christopher Isherwood =

English and American novelist (1904–1986)

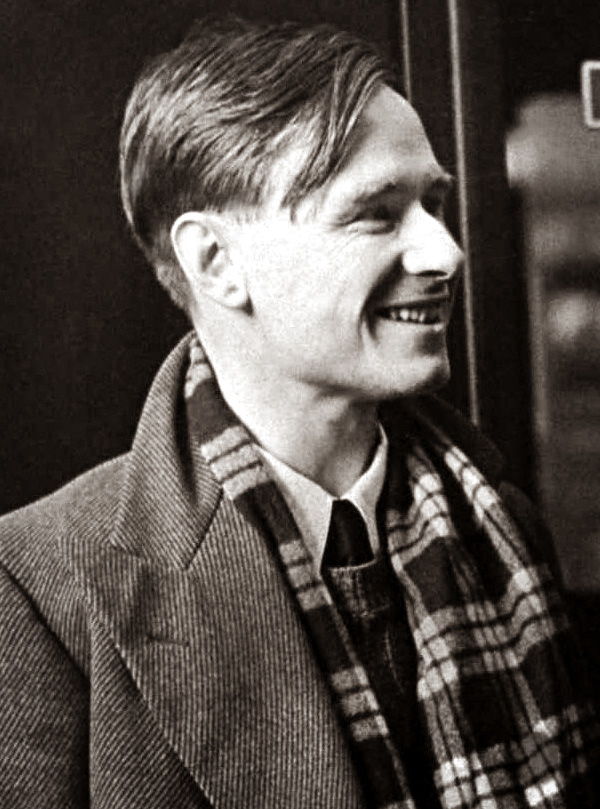
- Isherwood in 1938
- Born: Christopher William Bradshaw Isherwood; 26 August 1904; High Lane, Cheshire, England
- Died: 4 January 1986 (aged 81); Santa Monica, California, U.S.
- Citizenship: United Kingdom (1904–1946); United States (1946–1986)
- Education: Corpus Christi College, Cambridge; King's College London
- Occupations: Novelist; playwright; screenwriter; autobiographer; diarist
- Partner(s): Heinz Neddermeyer (1932–1937); Don Bachardy (1953–1986)
- Writing career
- Genres: Modernism, realism
- Notable works: The Berlin Stories; Mr Norris Changes Trains (1935); Goodbye to Berlin (1939); A Single Man; Christopher and His Kind

Christopher Isherwood (born Christopher William Bradshaw Isherwood; 26 August 1904 – 4 January 1986) was an English and American novelist, playwright, screenwriter, autobiographer, and diarist. His best-known works include Goodbye to Berlin (1939), a semi-autobiographical novel which was the basis for Cabaret (1966); A Single Man (1964), adapted into a film directed by Tom Ford in 2009; and Christopher and His Kind (1976), a memoir which "carried him into the heart of the Gay Liberation movement".

== Biography ==
=== Family ===
Isherwood was the elder son of Francis Edward Bradshaw Isherwood (1869–1915), known as Frank, a professional soldier in the York and Lancaster Regiment, and Kathleen Bradshaw Isherwood, née Machell Smith (1868–1960), the only daughter of a successful wine merchant. He was the grandson of John Henry Isherwood, squire of Marple Hall and Wyberslegh Hall, Cheshire, and he included among his ancestors the Puritan judge John Bradshaw, who signed the death warrant of King Charles I and served for two years as Lord President of the Council, effectively President of the English Republic.

Isherwood's father, Frank, was educated at the University of Cambridge and Sandhurst Military Academy, fought in the Boer War, and was killed in the First World War.

Isherwood's mother, Kathleen, was, through her own mother, a member of the wealthy Greene brewing family of Greene King, and Isherwood was a third cousin of the novelist Graham Greene, who was also related to the brewing family.

=== Early life and work ===
Isherwood was born in 1904 on his family's estate in Cheshire near Stockport in the north-west of England.

His parents christened their first son Christopher William Bradshaw-Isherwood. Between 1904 and 1913, the family holidayed on several occasions at Penmaenmawr in Wales, and Ventnor on the Isle of Wight. Isherwood was enrolled at St. Edmund's school, Hindhead, Surrey, beginning in 1914, where he met W. H. Auden, who became a life-long friend and colleague. In 1918, Isherwood left for Repton, his boarding school in Derbyshire.

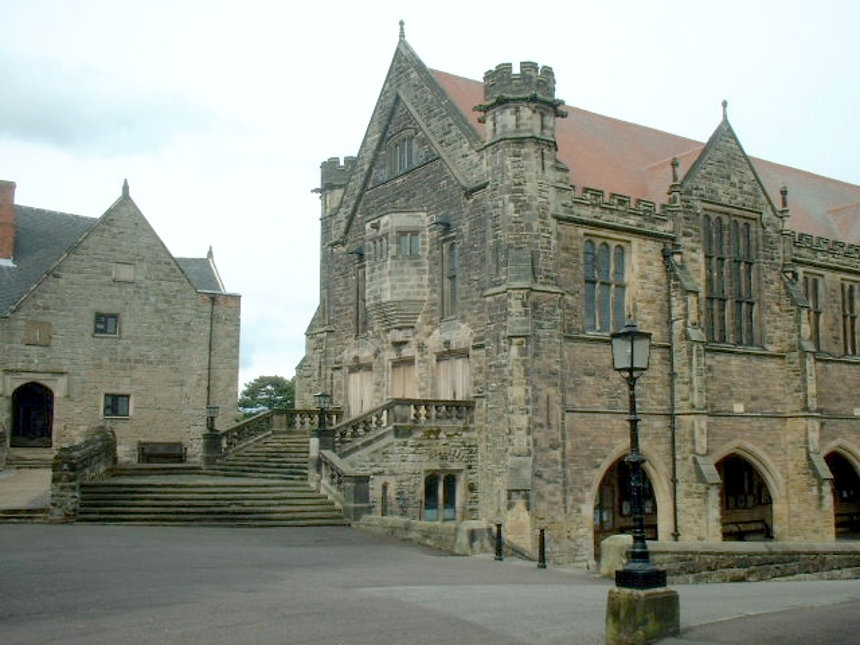
Repton School

At Repton, Isherwood met his lifelong friend Edward Upward, with whom he invented an imaginary English village called Mortmere, as related in his fictional autobiography, Lions and Shadows (1938). He went up to Corpus Christi College, Cambridge, as a history scholar, but wrote jokes and limericks on his second-year academic exam and was asked to leave without a degree in 1925.

At Christmas 1925, he was reintroduced to a prep school friend, W. H. Auden. Through Auden, Isherwood met the younger poet Stephen Spender, who printed Auden's first collection, Poems (1928). Upward, Isherwood, Auden, and Spender were identified as the most exciting new literary group in England in the 1930s. Auden dubbed Isherwood the novelist in what came to be known as the Auden Group or Auden Generation. With Cecil Day-Lewis and Louis MacNeice, Auden and Spender later attracted the name the MacSpaunday Poets, with which Isherwood is also associated.

After leaving Cambridge, Isherwood worked as a private tutor, and then as secretary to a string quartet led by the violinist André Mangeot. During this time, he completed his first novel, All the Conspirators, published in 1928, about the struggle for self-determination between children and their parents. Isherwood enrolled as a medical student at King's College London in October 1928, but he left after six months.

=== Sojourn in Berlin ===
In March 1929, Isherwood joined Auden in Berlin, where Auden was spending a post-graduate year. His primary motivation for making the trip was the sexual freedom that Weimar-era Berlin offered, as he later wrote: "To Christopher, Berlin meant Boys". The ten-day visit changed Isherwood's life. He began an affair with a German boy whom he met at a cellar bar called The Cosy Corner, and he was "brought face to face with his tribe" at Magnus Hirschfeld's Institute for Sexual Science. Isherwood visited Berlin again in July and relocated there in November.

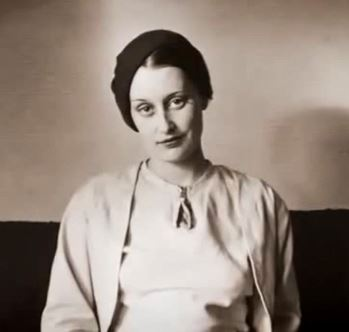
Jean Ross, a British expatriate and cabaret singer upon whom Isherwood based the character of Sally Bowles

In Berlin, Isherwood completed his second novel, The Memorial (1932), about the impact of the First World War on his family and his generation. He also continued his habit of keeping a diary. In his diary, he gathered raw material for Mr. Norris Changes Trains (1935), inspired by his real-life friendship with Gerald Hamilton, and for Goodbye to Berlin (1939), his portrait of the city in which Adolf Hitler was rising to power — enabled by poverty, unemployment, increasing attacks on Jews and Communists, and ignored by the defiant hedonism of night life in the cafés, bars, and brothels. Goodbye to Berlin included stories published in the leftist magazine New Writing, and it included Isherwood's 1937 novella Sally Bowles, in which he created his most famous character, based on a young Englishwoman, Jean Ross, with whom he briefly shared a flat.

In the United States, the Berlin novels were published together as The Berlin Stories in 1945. In 1951, Goodbye to Berlin was adapted for the New York stage by John van Druten using the title I Am a Camera, taken from Isherwood's opening paragraphs. The play inspired the hit Broadway musical Cabaret (1966), later adapted to film as Cabaret in 1972.

Isherwood was among the literary contributors to the New Party's weekly paper Action, which was launched shortly before the October 1931 election. He dubbed the publication "the rankest John Bull stuff" and was interested more in the financial compensation that came from contributing.

In 1932, the 27-year-old Isherwood started a relationship with Heinz Neddermeyer, then 16 or 17 years old. They fled Nazi Germany together in May 1933, traveling initially to Greece. Neddermeyer was refused entry to England in January 1934, launching an odyssey in search of a country where they could settle together. They lived in the Canary Islands, Copenhagen, Brussels, Amsterdam, and Sintra, Portugal, while trying to obtain a new nationality and passport for Neddermeyer.

In May 1937, while he and Isherwood were living in Luxembourg, Neddermeyer was suddenly expelled to Germany. Neddermeyer was arrested the next day by the Gestapo for draft evasion and reciprocal onanism. Neddermeyer was sentenced to three and a half years of hard labor and military service. He married in 1938, and the couple had one child, a son, born in 1940. Neddermeyer survived the war, and in 1956 sent Isherwood a letter asking for money to help escape East Germany, which Isherwood provided. The last known contact between the two men occurred circa 1972 when Isherwood sought Neddermeyer's permission to publicise their relationship in his forthcoming memoir Christopher and His Kind. Shocked by the frankness of Isherwood's memoir in discussing their relationship, Neddermeyer stated its publication would lead to his suicide. The two men never communicated again.

During this period, Isherwood returned often to London, where he took his first movie-writing job, working with Viennese director Berthold Viertel on the film Little Friend (1934). He collaborated with Auden on three plays: The Dog Beneath the Skin (1935), The Ascent of F6 (1936), and On the Frontier (1938) – all produced by Robert Medley and Rupert Doone's Group Theatre. He also worked on Lions and Shadows (1938), a fictionalised autobiography of his education — both in and out of school — in the 1920s.

In January 1938, Isherwood and Auden traveled to China to write Journey to a War (1939), about the Sino-Japanese conflict. They returned to England the following summer via the United States and decided to emigrate there in January 1939.

=== Life in the United States ===
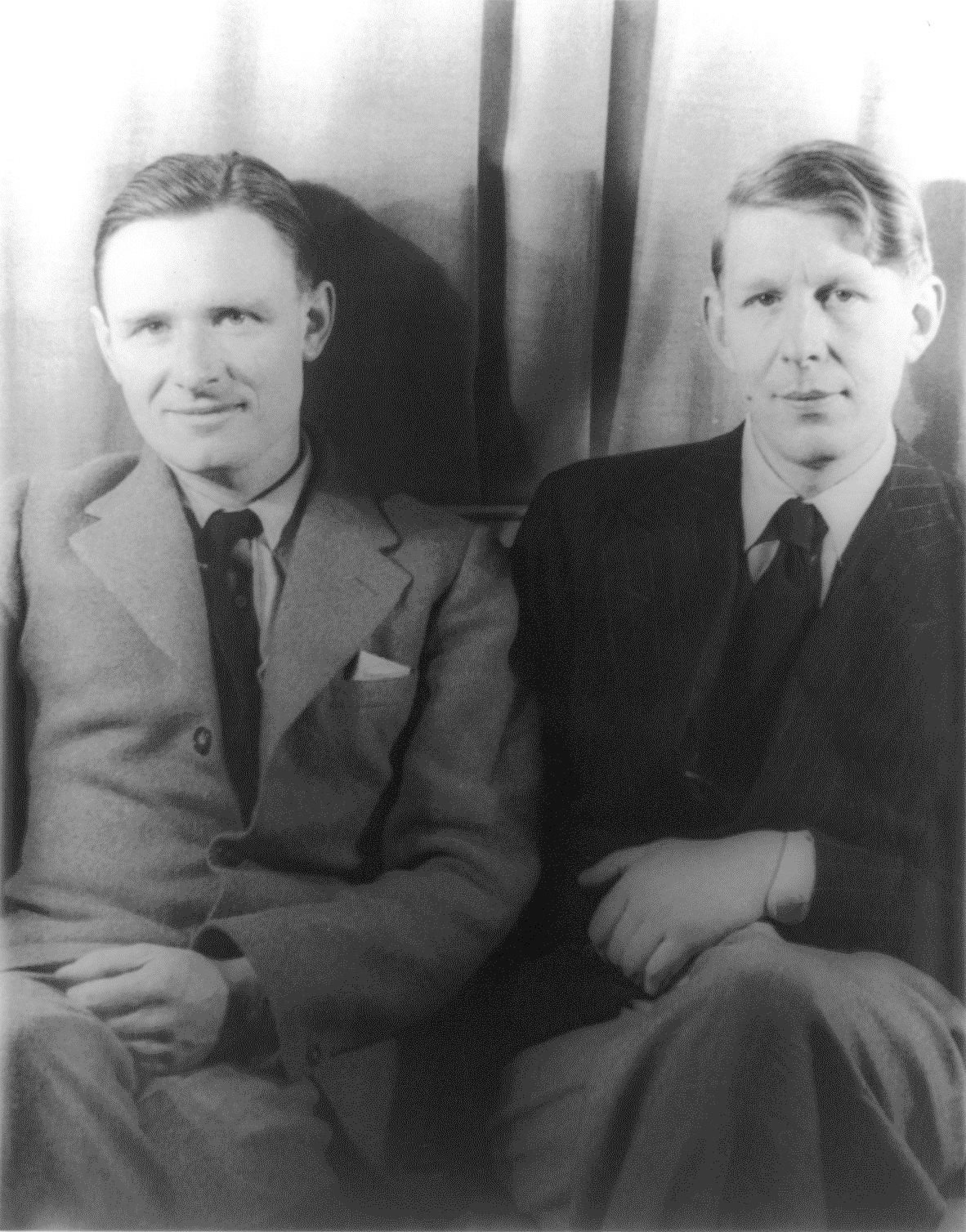
Isherwood (left) and W. H. Auden (right), photographed by Carl Van Vechten, 1939

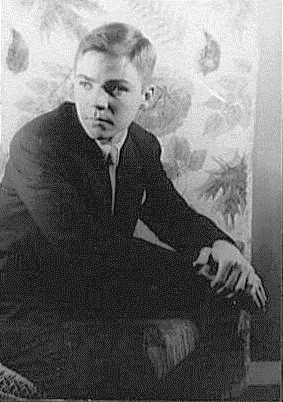
Don Bachardy at age 19 (1954), photographed by Carl Van Vechten

While living in Hollywood, California, Isherwood befriended Truman Capote, an up-and-coming young writer who would be influenced by Isherwood's Berlin Stories, most specifically in the traces of the story "Sally Bowles" that surface in Capote's famed novella Breakfast at Tiffany's.

Isherwood also befriended Dodie Smith, a British novelist and playwright who had also moved to California, and who became one of the few people to whom Isherwood showed his work in progress.

Isherwood considered becoming an American citizen in 1945 but balked at taking an oath that required him to defend the country. The next year, he applied for citizenship and answered questions honestly, saying he would accept non-combatant duties like loading ships with food. The fact that he had volunteered for service with the Medical Corps also helped. At the naturalisation ceremony, he was required to swear to defend the nation and decided to take the oath since he had already stated his objections and reservations. He became an American citizen on 8 November 1946. As part of his naturalisation, he removed "William Bradshaw" from his legal name.

He began living with the photographer William "Bill" Caskey. In 1947, the two traveled to South America. Isherwood wrote the prose, and Caskey took the photographs for a 1949 book about their journey entitled The Condor and the Cows. In a 1949 letter to Gore Vidal, Isherwood discussed gay relationships like his own:

Homosexual relationships can be and frequently are happy. Many men live together for years and share their lives and their work, just as heterosexuals do. This truth is particularly disturbing and shocking even to “liberal people,” because it cuts across the romantic, tragic notion of homosexual fate.

=== Meeting Don Bachardy ===
In October 1952, at the age of 48, he met the 18-year-old Don Bachardy among a group of friends on the beach at Santa Monica. Despite the age difference, this meeting began a partnership that, though interrupted by affairs and separations, continued until Isherwood's death.

During the early months of their affair, Isherwood finished — and Bachardy typed — the novel on which he had worked for some years, The World in the Evening (1954). Isherwood also taught a course on modern English literature at Los Angeles State College (now California State University, Los Angeles) for several years during the 1950s and early 1960s.

The 30-year age difference between Isherwood and Bachardy raised eyebrows at the time, with Bachardy, in his own words "regarded as a sort of child prostitute", but the two became a well-known and well-established couple in Southern Californian society with many Hollywood friends.

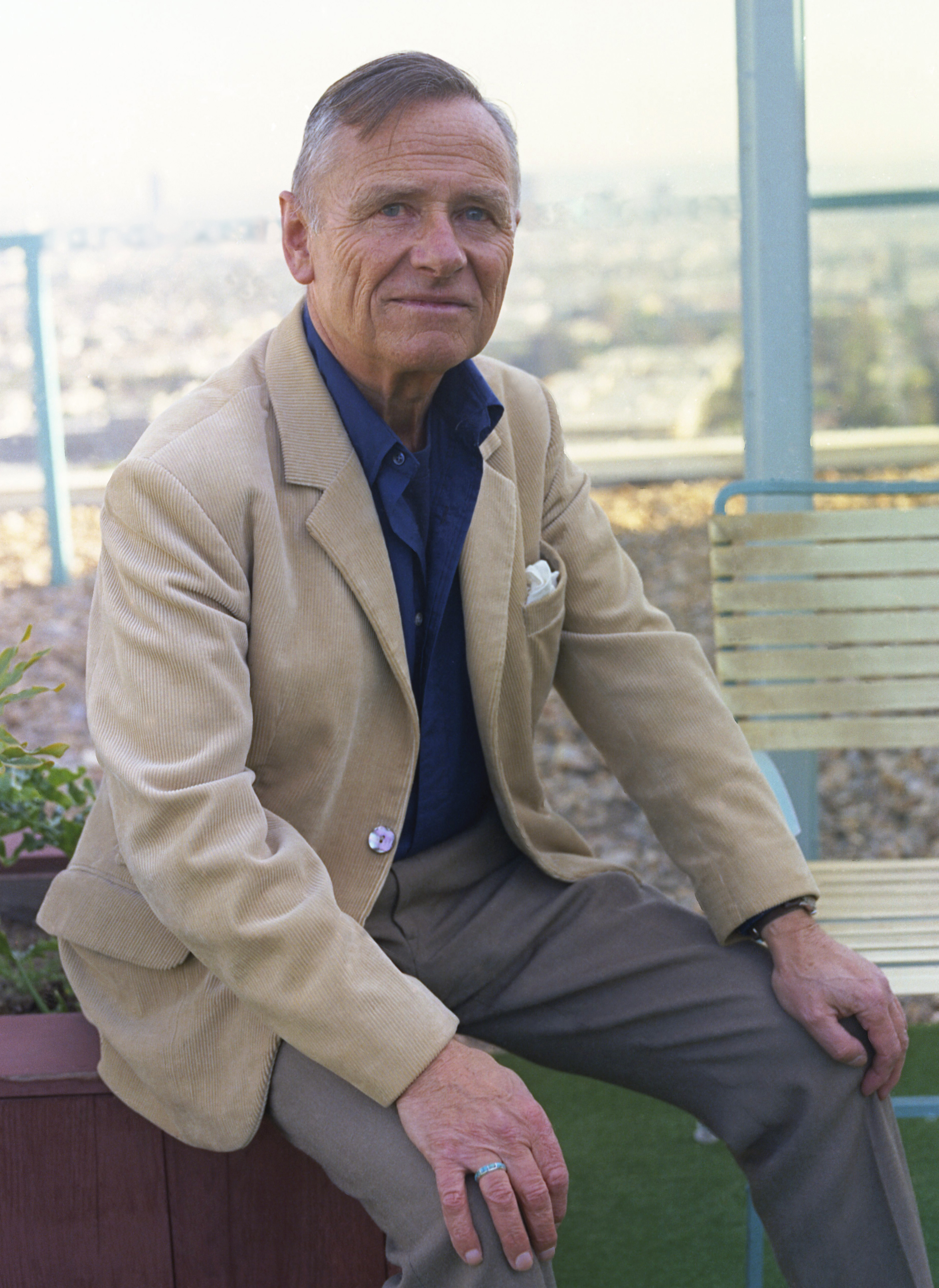
Isherwood in 1973

Down There on a Visit, a novel published in 1962, comprised four related stories that overlap the period covered in his Berlin stories. In the opinion of many reviewers, Isherwood's finest achievement was his 1964 novel, A Single Man, that depicted a day in the life of George, a middle-aged, gay Englishman who is a professor at a Los Angeles university. The novel was adapted into a film of the same name in 2009.

During 1964, Isherwood collaborated with American writer Terry Southern on the screenplay for the Tony Richardson film adaptation of The Loved One, Evelyn Waugh's caustic satire on the American funeral industry.

The artist David Hockney was introduced to Isherwood and Bachardy by the poet Stephen Spender. Hockney's 1968 portrait of the couple at their Santa Monica home was the first of seven Hockney painted in his series of double portraits. It sold for $44.3 million at auction in 2025.

=== Final years and death ===
Isherwood and Bachardy lived together in Santa Monica for the rest of Isherwood's life. Isherwood was diagnosed with prostate cancer in 1981, and died of the disease on 4 January 1986 at his Santa Monica home, aged 81. His body was donated to medical science at UCLA, and his ashes were later scattered at sea. Bachardy became a successful artist with an independent reputation, and his portraits of the dying Isherwood became well known after Isherwood's death.

=== Association with Vedanta ===
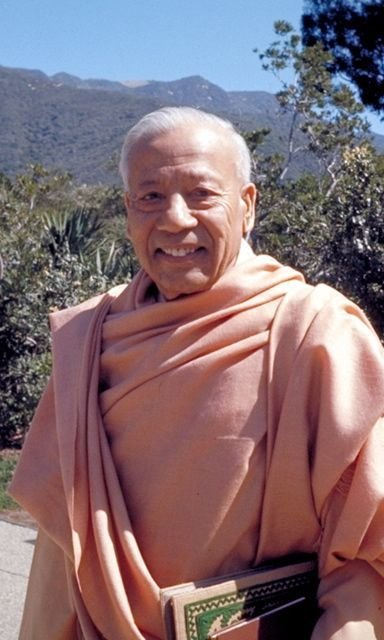
Swami Prabhavananda circa 1972

Gerald Heard had introduced British writer Aldous Huxley to Vedanta (Hindu-centered philosophy) and meditation. After migrating to America in 1937, Heard and Huxley became Vedantists attending functions at the Vedanta Society of Southern California, under the guidance of founder Swami Prabhavananda, a monk of the Ramakrishna Order of India. Both were initiated by the Swami. Heard and Huxley introduced Isherwood to the Swami's Vedanta Society. Over time, Isherwood developed a close friendship with Huxley, with whom he sometimes collaborated. Isherwood became a dedicated Vedantist himself and was initiated by Prabhavananda, his guru.

The process of conversion to Vedanta was so intense that Isherwood was unable to write another novel between the years 1939–1945, while he immersed himself in study of the Vedanta Scriptures, even becoming a monk for a time at the Society. For the next 35 years, Isherwood collaborated with the Swami on translations of various Vedanta scriptures, including the Bhagavad Gita – The Song of God, writing articles for the Society's journal, and occasionally lecturing at the Hollywood and Santa Barbara temples. For many years he would come to the Hollywood temple on Wednesday nights to read the Gospel of Ramakrishna for a half an hour, then the Swami would take questions from the devotees.

From 1950 to 1978, Isherwood gave 53 lectures at the Hollywood and Santa Barbara Vedanta Temples. He mentions in his diaries and the book, My Guru and His Disciple, that he feels unqualified to preach, so most of his lectures were readings of papers written by others, primarily Swami Vivekananda. There were a few original lectures including, Who Is Ramakrishna, The Writer and Vedanta, and a lecture on Girish Chandra Ghosh, a householder disciple of Ramakrishna.

Isherwood was also very involved in the production of the bi-monthly journal of the Vedanta Society of Southern California, Vedanta and the West. From 1943 to 1945, he was Managing Editor; from 1951 to 1962, he was an editorial advisor together with Aldous Huxley, Gerald Heard, and additionally with John van Druten from 1951 to 1958. From 1949 to 1969, he wrote 40 articles for the journal.

=== Isherwood and war ===
Isherwood's father, Frank Bradshaw-Isherwood, was a colonel in the British Army. He was killed during World War I in the Battle of Ypres, France, in May 1915, at the age of 46. Isherwood was 10 years old at the time. His father's death "...deeply affected him, not only in his perspective of his father and how he would relate to his mother, but in his attitude towards the military and war itself." Isherwood's second novel, The Memorial, published in 1932, describes the impact on a family from the death of the father in World War I. The Memorial was the first of what would become the trademark for Isherwood: reflecting his life experience into the plot of a novel.

After being asked to leave Cambridge, he lived in Berlin and witnessed the rising power of Fascism, the Nazi Party, and Hitler. Isherwood describes the times in his autobiographical novels The Berlin Stories. In 1933, Isherwood fled Germany with his friend Heinz Neddermeyer seeking asylum for Heinz — who was refused entry to England. Heinz was finally arrested in May 1937 by the Gestapo for draft evasion and practising homosexuality.

Back in London, Isherwood's sympathies were with the left, but although the Anti-war movement flourished after World War I, it was fractured into opposing ideological groups. Some wanted to join the fight in the Spanish Civil War, others wanting to just let the Germans in, rather than go to war, still others advocated non-violent resistance, all of which had the effect of weakening their political power. The fighting in Spain was savage, and "...the left tore itself apart with squabbling and paranoia. Veterans came to feel that the idealism of the cause had been exploited, and many resented being policed by shadowy Communist enforcers."

In 1937, two of the largest peace groups joined forces; the No More War Movement merged into the Peace Pledge Union. The members attested to the following pledge: "War is a crime against humanity. I renounce war, and am therefore determined not to support any kind of war. I am also determined to work for the removal of all causes of war". Some of the leading authors and intellectuals of the time gave speeches and lent their names to the cause, including Gerald Heard, Aldous Huxley, and Bertrand Russell.

Inspired by Ernest Hemingway's reporting from the Spanish Civil War, in January 1938, Isherwood and his friend W. H. Auden traveled to China to cover the invasion by Japan and wrote Journey to a War (1939). They returned to England the following summer via the United States and decided to emigrate there in January 1939. At this point, Isherwood wasn't clear about his own anti-war beliefs. On the way to America, he realised he was a Pacifist, as he would be unwilling to kill his friend Heinz, "Heinz is in the Nazi army. I wouldn't kill Heinz. Therefore I have no right to kill anybody". He had lost his political faith, "I couldn't repeat the left-wing slogans which I had been repeating throughout the last few years."

After moving to California, Isherwood sought "...advice from Gerald Heard and Aldous Huxley about becoming a pacifist, and, like them, he became a disciple of the Ramakrishna monk, Swami Prabhavananda, head of the Vedanta Society of Southern California." He applied for citizenship and registered as a Conscientious Objector. In Pennsylvania, he worked in a Quaker Hostel, helping to settle European Jews who were fleeing the Nazis.

In 1944, the translation of the Hindu scripture, Bhagavad Gita – The Song of God that the Swami and Isherwood had been working on was published. In the appendix, there is an essay by Isherwood titled The Gita and War. There Isherwood explains the Vedantic view of war and duty. The plot of the poem is that the whole of India is drawn into a great battle, and on the eve of the fight, Arjuna, the hero warrior of the epic poem, The Mahabharata, is taken between the two armies and sees friends, family, and worthy people on both sides, throws down his weapons and says, "I will not fight." The rest of the book has Lord Krishna, Arjuna's friend and advisor, explaining the nature of duty. It may be, for some person, at some time, proper to refuse to fight, but if the cause is righteous, and it's your duty as a warrior to fight, it would be a moral hazard to refuse.

== Legacy and recognition ==
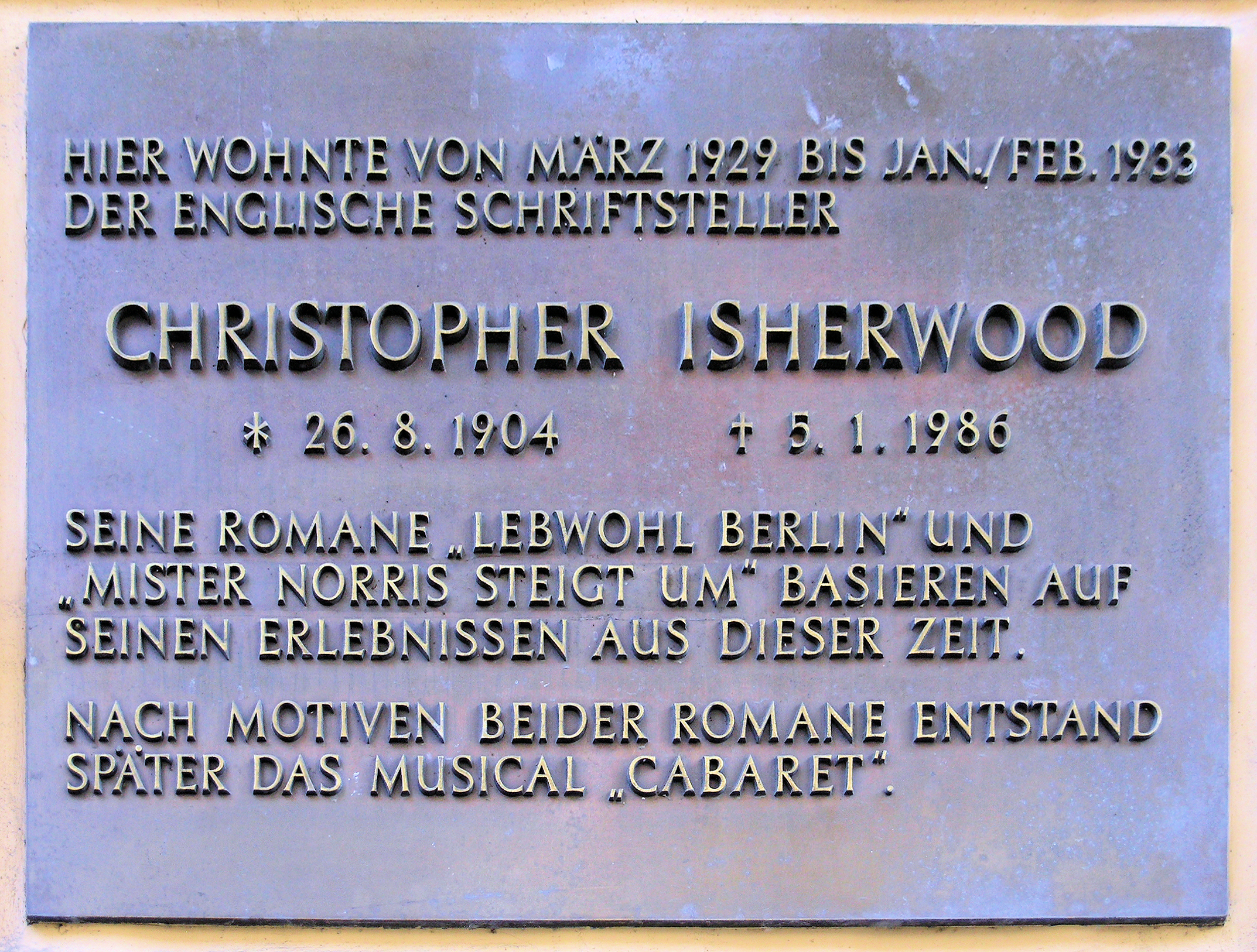
Plaque, Nollendorfstraße 17. Isherwood lived here between March 1929 and January/February 1933. (The dates on the plaque are incorrect: Apart from the date of death being the 4th, not the 5th, Isherwood moved to Nollendorfstraße in December 1930 and, according to his memoirs Christopher and His Kind, left three days after witnessing the May 10th 1933 Nazi book burning at Opernplatz)

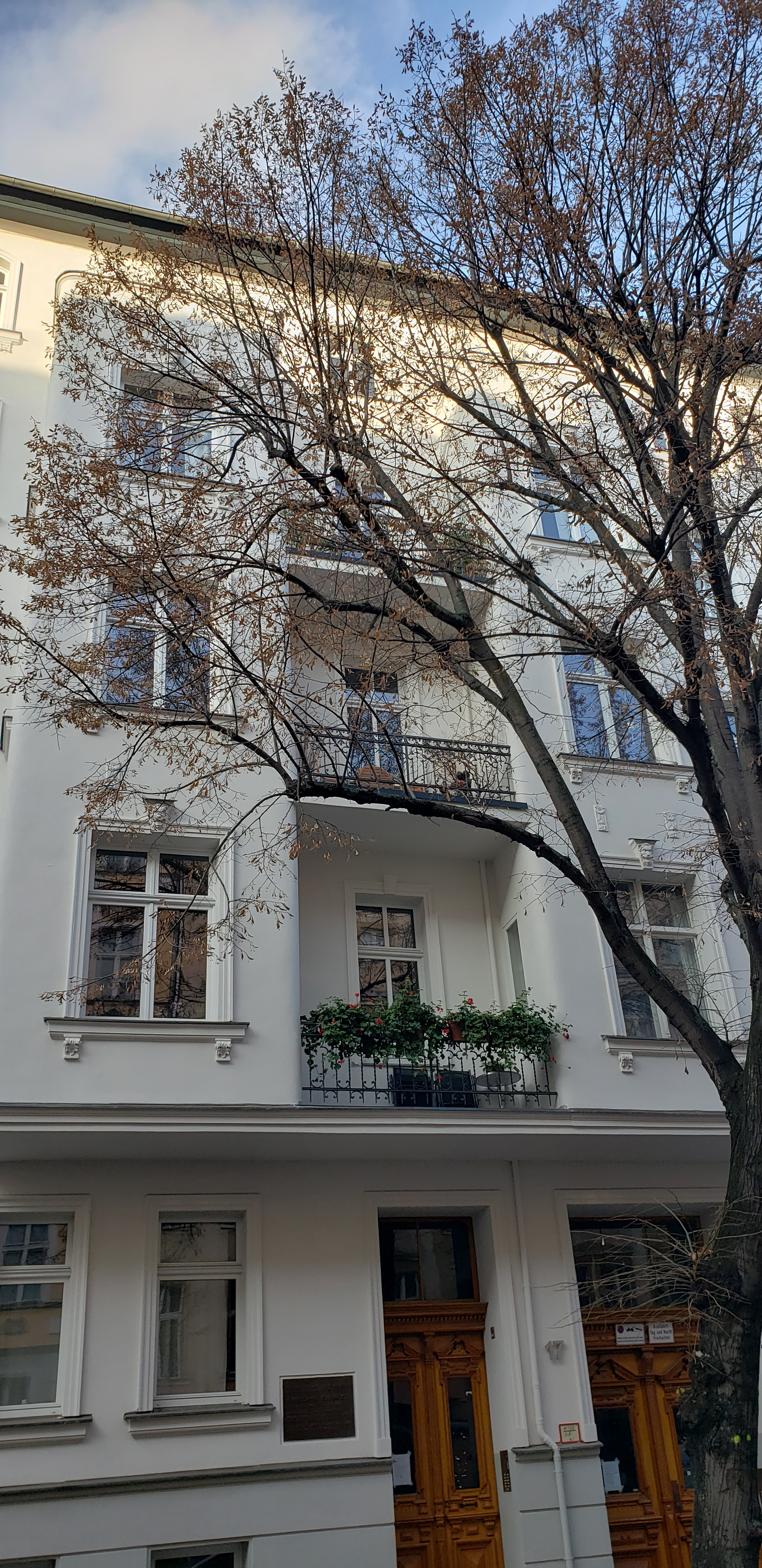
Isherwood's Nollendorfstraße residence

- The house in the Schöneberg district of Berlin where Isherwood lived bears a memorial plaque to mark his stay there between 1929 and 1933.
- Isherwood is mentioned in Susan Sontag's Notes on "Camp" (1964): "Apart from a lazy two-page sketch in Christopher Isherwood's novel The World in the Evening (1954), [camp] has hardly broken into print."
- The 2008 film Chris & Don: A Love Story chronicled Isherwood and Bachardy's lifelong relationship.
- A Single Man was adapted into a film, A Single Man, in 2009.
- In 2010, Isherwood's autobiography, Christopher and His Kind, was adapted into a television film by the BBC, starring Matt Smith as Isherwood and directed by Geoffrey Sax. The closing credits list Don Bachardy as Consultant. It was broadcast in France and Germany on the Arte channel in February 2011, and in Britain on BBC 2 the following month.
- The annual Los Angeles Times – Christopher Isherwood Prize for Autobiographical Prose was established in partnership with the Los Angeles Times in 2016.

== Works ==
=== Fiction ===
- All the Conspirators (1928; new edition 1957 with new foreword)
- The Memorial (1932)
- Mr Norris Changes Trains (1935; U.S. edition titled The Last of Mr Norris)
- "Sally Bowles" (1937; novella later included in Goodbye to Berlin)
- Goodbye to Berlin (1939)
- Prater Violet (1945)
- The Berlin Stories (1945; collects Mr Norris Changes Trains and Goodbye to Berlin)
- The World in the Evening (1954)
- Down There on a Visit (1962)
- A Single Man (1964)
- A Meeting by the River (1967)
- Frankenstein: The True Story (1973, with Don Bachardy; based on their 1973 film script)
- The Mortmere Stories (with Edward Upward) (1994)
- "Jacob's Hands: A Fable" (1997), originally co-written with Aldous Huxley

=== Autobiography, diaries and letters ===
- Lions and Shadows (1938, autobiographical fiction). Reissued: Minneapolis: University of Minnesota Press, 2000
- Kathleen and Frank (1971, about Isherwood's parents)
- Christopher and His Kind (1976, autobiography), 130-copy edition printed by Sylvester & Orphanos, regular publication by Farrar, Straus, & Giroux
- My Guru and His Disciple (1980)
- October (1980, with Don Bachardy)
- Diaries: 1939–1960, Katherine Bucknell, ed. (1996)
- Lost Years: A Memoir 1945–1951, Katherine Bucknell, ed. (2000)
- Kathleen and Christopher, Lisa Colletta, ed. (Letters to his mother, Minneapolis: University of Minnesota Press, 2005)
- Isherwood on Writing (University of Minnesota Press, 2007; lectures)
- The Sixties: Diaries:1960–1969 Katherine Bucknell, ed. 2010
- Liberation: Diaries:1970–1983 Katherine Bucknell, ed. 2012
- The Animals: Love Letters Between Christopher Isherwood and Don Bachardy, Edited by Katherine Bucknell (Farrar, Straus and Giroux, 2014)

=== Biography ===
- Ramakrishna and His Disciples (1965)

=== Plays ===
- The Dog Beneath the Skin (1935, with W. H. Auden)
- The Ascent of F6 (1937, with W. H. Auden)
- On the Frontier (1938, with W. H. Auden)

=== Travel ===
- Journey to a War (1939, with W. H. Auden)
- The Condor and the Cows (1949, South-American travel diary)

=== Collections ===
- Exhumations (1966; journalism and stories)
- Where Joy Resides: An Isherwood Reader (1989; Don Bachardy and James P. White, eds.)

=== Translations ===
- Charles Baudelaire, Intimate Journals (1930; revised edition 1947)
- Bhagavad Gita – The Song of God (with Swami Prabhavananda, 1944)
- Shankara's Crest-Jewel of Discrimination (with Swami Prabhavananda, 1947)
- How to Know God: The Yoga Aphorisms of Patanjali (with Swami Prabhavananda, 1953)

=== Writing on Vedanta ===
==== Books and pamphlets ====
- Vedanta for the Western World (1945, Marcel Rodd Co.; published in England by George Allen & Unwin, 1948; ed. and introduction, plus several contributions)
- Vedanta for Modern Man (1951, Harper & Brothers; published in England by George Allen & Unwin, 1952; ed. and contributor)
- What Vedanta Means to Me (1951, pamphlet)
- An Approach to Vedanta (1963)
- Essentials of Vedanta (1969)

==== Articles in Vedanta and the West ====
Vedanta and the West (originally titled Voice of India from 1938 to 1940) was the official publication of the Vedanta Society of Southern California. It offered essays by many of the leading intellectuals of the time and had contributions from Aldous Huxley, Gerald Heard, Alan Watts, J. Krishnamurti, W. Somerset Maugham, and many others.

Isherwood wrote the following articles that appeared in Vedanta and the West:

- "Vivekananda and Sarah Bernhardt" – 1943
- "On Translating the Gita" – 1944
- "Hypothesis and Belief" – 1944
- "The Gita and War" – 1944
- "What is Vedanta?" – 1944
- "Ramakrishna and Vivekananda" – 1945
- "The Problem of the Religious Novel" – 1946
- "Religion Without Prayers" – 1946
- "Foreword to a Man of Boys" – 1950
- "An Introduction" – 1951
- "What Vedanta Means to Me" – 1951
- "Who Is Ramakrishna?" – 1957
- "Ramakrishna and the Future" – 1958
- "The Home of Ramakrishna" – 1958
- "Ramakrishna: A First Chapter" – 1959
- "The Birth of Ramakrishna" – 1959
- "The Boyhood of Ramakrishna" – 1959
- "How Ramakrishna Came to Dakshineswar" – 1959
- "Early Days at Dakshineswar" – 1959
- "The Vision of Kali" – 1960
- "The Marriage of Ramakrishna" – 1960
- "The Coming of the Bhariravi" – 1960
- "Some Visitors to Dakshineswar" – 1960
- "Tota Puri" – 1960
- "The Writer and Vedanta" – 1961
- "Mathur" – 1961
- "Sarada and Chandra" – 1962
- "Keshab Sen" – 1962
- "The Coming of the Disciples" – 1962
- "Introduction to Vivekananda" – 1962
- "Naren" – 1963
- "The Training of Naren" – 1963
- "An Approach to Vedanta" – 1963
- The Young Monks – 1963
- "Some Great Devotees" – 1963
- "The Gospel of Sri Ramakrishna" – 1963
- "The Last Year" – 1964
- "The Story Continues" – 1964
- "Letters of Swami Vivekananda" – 1968
- "Essentials of Vedanta" – 1969

In 1945, sixty-eight articles from Vedanta and the West were collected in book form as Vedanta for the Western World. Isherwood edited the selection and provided an introduction and three articles ("Hypothesis and Belief", "Vivekananda and Sarah Bernhardt", "The Gita and War"). Other contributors included Aldous Huxley, Gerald Heard, Swami Prabhavananda, Swami Vivekananda, and John Van Druten.

== Audio and video recordings ==
- Christopher Isherwood reads selections from the Bhagavad Gita – CD
- Christopher Isherwood reads selections from the Upanishads – CD
- Lecture on Girish Ghosh – CD
- Christopher Isherwood Reads Two Lectures on the Bhagavad Gita by Swami Vivekananda – DVD
