= Adaptations of works of Rabindranath Tagore in film and television =

Below is a list of adaptations of works of Rabindranath Tagore in film and television.

== Adaptations in film ==
Year	Title	Director	Language	Based on
1927	Balidan (Sacrifice)	Nanand Bhojai and Naval Gandhi	Hindi (silent)	Visarjan (1890 play)
1929	Giribala	Madhu Bose		Giribala (1895 short story)
1932	Chirakumar Sabha	Premankur Atorthy		Chirakumar Sabha (The Bachelor's Club; 1904 novel)
1932	Natir Puja	Rabindranath Tagore	Bangali	Natir Puja
1938	Chokher Bali	Satu Sen	Bengali	Chokher Bali (Sand in the Eye; 1901 novella)
1938	Gora (film)	Naresh Mitra		Gora (Fair-Faced;1909 novel)
1942	Sodh Bodh	Saumyen Mukherji		Sodh Bodh (All Square; 1926 comedy)
1946	Milan	Nitin Bose	Hindi	Noukadubi (The Wreck; 1906 novel)
1947	Noukadubi (1947 film) (Bengali remake of Milan)	Nitin Bose	Bengali	Noukadubi (The Wreck; 1906 novel)
1953	Do Bigha Zamin	Bimal Roy	Hindi	"Dui Bigha Jomi" (Two Bighas of Land; poem)
1956	Mathar Kula Manickam	T. Prakash Rao	Tamil	Noukadubi (The Wreck; 1906 novel)
1956	Charana Daasi	T. Prakash Rao	Telugu	Noukadubi (The Wreck; 1906 novel)
1957	Kabuliwala	Tapan Sinha	Bengali	Kabuliwala (The Fruitseller from Kabul; 1892 short story)
1960	Ghunghat	Ramanand Sagar	Hindi	Noukadubi (The Wreck; 1906 novel)
1960	Kshudhita Pashan	Tapan Sinha	Bengali	Kshudhita Pashan (The Hungry Stones; 1895 short story)
1960	Khokababur Pratyabartan	Agradoot	Bengali	Khokababur Pratyabartan (Return of Khokababu; 1891 short story)
1961	Teen Kanya	Satyajit Ray	Bengali	The Postmaster, Monihara (The Lost Jewels), Samapti (The Conclusion) (1891, 1898, 1893)
1961	Kabuliwala	Hemen Gupta	Hindi	Kabuliwala (The Fruitseller from Kabul; 1892 short story)
1964	Charulata	Satyajit Ray	Bengali	Nastanirh (The Broken Nest; 1901 novella)
1964	Dak Ghar	Zul Vellani	Hindi	Dak Ghar; (The Post Office; 1912 play)
1965	Dak Ghar	N/A	Bengali	Dak Ghar; (The Post Office; 1912 play)
1965	Atithi	Tapan Sinha	Bengali	Atithi (The Runaway; 1895 short-story)
1969	Megh o Roudra	Arundhati Devi	Bengali	Megh o Roudra (Sun and Showers)
1970	Ichhapuran	Mrinal Sen	Bengali	Ichchhapuran (short-story)
1971	Uphaar	Sudhendu Roy	Hindi	Samapti (The Conclusion; 1893 short story)
1971	Malyadan	Ajoy Kar	Bengali	
1972	Strir Patra	Purnendu Patri	Bengali	
1975	Geet Gaata Chal	Hiren Nag	Hindi	Atithi (The Runaway; 1895; short story)
1985	Ghare Baire	Satyajit Ray	Bengali	Ghare Baire (The Home and the World; 1916 novel)
1991	Lekin...	Gulzar	Hindi	Kshudhit Pashaan (The Hungry Stones; 1895 short story)
1997	Char Adhyay	Kumar Shahani	Hindi	Char Adhyay (Four Chapters; 1934 novel)
1997	Oka Chinna Maata	Muthyala Subbaiah	Telugu	Noukadubi (The Wreck; 1906 novel)
2003	Chokher Bali	Rituparno Ghosh	Bengali	Chokher Bali (Sand in the Eye; 1901 novella)
2004	Shasti	Chashi Nazrul Islam	Bengali	Shasti (Punishment; short story)
2006	Shuva	Chashi Nazrul Islam	Bengali	Shuvashini (short story)
2008	Chaturanga	Suman Mukherjee	Bengali	Chaturanga (Quartet; 1916 novel)
2012	Abujh Bou	Nargis Akhtar	Bengali	
2011	Noukadubi	Rituparno Ghosh	Bengali	Noukadubi (The Wreck; 1906 novel)
2011	Charuulata 2011	Agnidev Chatterjee	Bengali	Nastanirh (The Broken Nest; 1901 novella)
2012	Elar Char Adhyay	Bappaditya Bandyopadhyay	Bengali	Char Adhyay (Four Chapters; 1934 novel)
2012	Tasher Desh	Qaushiq Mukherjee	Bengali	Tasher Desh (The Land of Cards; 1933 drama)
2012	Chitrangada: The Crowning Wish	Rituparno Ghosh	Bengali	Chitra (1913 play)
2012	Mukti	Buddhadev Dasgupta	Hindi	Tagore's poems
2012	Patralekha	Buddhadeb Dasgupta	Hindi	Tagore's poems
2013	An Obsolete Altar	Mrigankasekhar Ganguly and Hyash Tanmoy	Bengali	Achalayatan (The Immovable; 1912 play)
2013	Dekha, Na-Dekhay	Arnab Ghoshal	Bengali	Aparichita (The Unknown Woman ; short story)
2014	Shesher Kobita ( 2014 film)	Suman Mukhopadhyay	Bengali	Shesher Kabita (The Last Poem or Farewell Song; 1929 novel)
2014	Taptapadi	Sachin Balram Nagargoje	Marathi	Dristidaan
2015	Jogajog	Shekhar Das	Bengali	Jogajog (Relationships; 1929 novel)
2015	Gora	Shukla Mitra		Gora (Fair-Faced;1909 novel)
2016	Postmaster	Srijon Bardhan	Bengali	The Postmaster (1891 short story)
2016	Dristi	Prodyut Kumar Deka	Assamese	
2017	Detective	Prodyut Kumar Deka	Bengali	Detective (1898 short story)
2017	Bioscopewala	Deb Medhekar	Hindi	Kabuliwala (1892 short story)
2018	Laboratory	Soumik Chattopadhyay	Bengali	
2020	Detective (2020 film)	Joydip Mukherjee	Bengali	
2020	Darbaan	Bipin Nadkarni	Hindi	The Child's Return (1918 short story)

== Adaptations on television ==
- In 2012 Hindi channel Doordarshan broadcast a 26-episode television series based the Tagore's novel Gora (1909) by producer Gargi Sen and director Somnath Sen.
- In 2015, Anurag Basu adapted many short stories of Tagore in a show titled Stories by Rabindranath Tagore, which was aired on EPIC channel. The 26-episode Season 1 was based on many famous short stories such as Chokher Bali, Atithi, Nastanirh, and Kabuliwallah among others.
- Directors Abhijit Guha and Sudeshna Roy ran a series of Tagore's stories titled Robi Thakurer Golpo, which was aired on Colors Bangla and was launched on 19 November 2015. Each story is shown in three episodes. The series consisted of more than a dozen stories, including Dena Paona, Shamapti, Kabuliwala, Postmaster, Khokababur Pratyabartan, Manihara, Jeebito Mrityu, Madhyabartini, Manbhanjan, Nastanirh, Strir Patra, Noukadubi and Chokher Bali, among others.

== See also ==
- Works of Rabindranath Tagore
- List of works by Rabindranath Tagore
- Celebrating Tagore
