= Gora (novel) =

Bengali novel written by Rabindranath Tagore

- Cover page of Gora (Bengali)
- Author: Rabindranath Tagore
- Original title: গোরা (White or Fair)
- Language: Bengali
- Genre: Novel
- Set in: Bengal
- Publication date: 1910
- Publication place: British India
- Pages: 624
- ISBN: 978-8-171-67755-9
- Preceded by: Noukadubi
- Followed by: Chaturanga

Gora (Bengali: গোরা) is a novel by Rabindranath Tagore, set in Calcutta (now Kolkata), in the 1880s during the British Raj. It is the fifth in order of writing and the longest of Tagore's twelve novels. It is rich in philosophical debate on politics and religion. Other themes include liberation, universalism, brotherhood, gender, feminism, caste, class, tradition versus modernity, urban elite versus rural peasants, colonial rule, nationalism and the Brahmo Samaj.

== Contents ==
Gora consists of two parallel love stories of two pairs of lovers: Gora and Sucharita, Binoy and Lolita. Their emotional development is shown in the background of the social and political problems prevalent in India towards the end of the 19th-century.

== Translations ==
The translation of Gora into English by W. W. Pearson was published in 1924. Half of this version had been revised by Tagore's own nephew, Surendranath Tagore. On the basis of this translation, a French translation was made by Marguerite Glotz in 1927, revised on the Bengali original by Pierre Fallon s.j. and published in 1961; another French translation based on a typescript of the first English translation had been prepared by Madeleine Rolland already in 1923 but was never completed. A new English translation by Sujit Mukherjee, based on the better text of the Bengali Collected Works of Rabindranath (1941), was issued at the Sahitya Akademy, New Delhi, in 1997. On the same better basis, an English translation by Radha Chakravarty was published by Random House in 2009 (Penguin Modern Classics). A German translation by Helene Meyer-Franck appeared in 1924, and by Gisela Leiste in 1980. A Hindi translation was made by the famous Hindi poet and author Agyeya. For his Malayalam translation, Dr. K. C. Ajayakumar has won in 2015 the Sahitya Akademi Award.

== Adaptations ==
Film adaptations exist from 1938, when director Naresh Mitra made a Bengali film in the same name based on the novel. and from 2015, directed by Shukla Mitra. In 2012 Hindi channel Doordarshan broadcast a 26-episode television series by producer Gargi Sen and director Somnath Sen.

== See also ==
- Works of Rabindranath Tagore
- List of works by Rabindranath Tagore
- Adaptations of works of Rabindranath Tagore in film and television
