= Oka Chinna Maata =

- Poster
- Directed by: Muthyala Subbaiah
- Written by: Diwakar Babu (dialogues)
- Screenplay by: Muthyala Subbaiah
- Story by: Bhupathi Raja
- Based on: Charana Daasi (1956); The Wreck (Novel)
- Produced by: B. Siva Rama Krishna
- Starring: Jagapathi Babu; Indraja
- Cinematography: V. Srinivasa Reddy
- Edited by: Kola Bhaskar
- Music by: Bharadwaj
- Production company: Sri Venkateswara Art Films
- Release date: 27 May 1997
- Running time: 148 minutes
- Country: India
- Language: Telugu

Oka Chinna Maata (transl. One small word) is a 1997 Indian Telugu-language romance film produced by B. Siva Rama Krishna under the Sri Venkateswara Art Films banner and directed by Muthyala Subbaiah. It stars Jagapathi Babu and Indraja, with music composed by Bharadwaj. The film was recorded as a super hit at the box office. The storyline was inspired by Charana Daasi (1956), which is based on Rabindranath Tagore's 1906 novel Noukadubi.

== Cast ==
- Jagapati Babu as Chandu / Chanti
- Indraja as Geeta
- Satyanarayana as Abbayi
- Rajeev Raj as Rajeev
- Brahmanandam as vendor
- Babu Mohan as Murthy
- Mallikarjuna Rao as Chanchal Rao
- AVS as Manmadha Rao
- Chalapathi Rao as Chalapati Rao
- Suthivelu as Parandamaiah
- Raghunatha Reddy as Abbayi's brother-in-law
- Gundu Hanumantha Rao as Malokam
- Kallu Chidambaram as photographer
- Tirupathi Prakash as photographer
- Gautham Raju as auto driver
- Junior Relangi as Relangi
- Jenny
- Raksha as Sireesha
- Annapurna as Sireesha's mother
- Sri Lakshmi as Chanchal Rao's wife
- Bangalore Padma as Ammayi
- Ragini as Ragini
- Padma Jayanthi
- Ramyasri as Rathalu
- Y. Vijaya as Relangi's wife

== Soundtrack ==
Oka Chinna Maata

Soundtrack album by Bharadwaj
- Released: 1997
- Recorded: 1997
- Genre: Soundtrack
- Length: 29:24
- Label: Supreme Music
- Producer: Bharadwaj

Bharadwaj chronology
Dongaata (1996)	Oka Chinna Maata (1997)	Kaadhal Mannan (1998)

Music composed by Bharadwaj. The music is released on Supreme Music Company.

No.	Title	Lyrics	Singer(s)	Length
1.	"O Manasaa Thondhara"	Bhuvanachandra	S. P. Balasubrahmanyam, K. S. Chithra	5:00
2.	"Kurrakaaru Poojinche"	Sirivennela Sitarama Sastry	S. P. Balasubrahmanyam, K. S. Chithra	5:07
3.	"Mu Mu Mu Mu Muddistha Methaga"	Bhuvanachandra	Mano, Srilekha	5:06
4.	"Madhuramu Kaadhaa"	Sirivennela Sitarama Sastry	K. S. Chithra	4:07
5.	"Prathi Okariki Tholi Valapuna"	Sirivennela Sitarama Sastry	S. P. Balasubrahmanyam, K. S. Chithra	5:09
6.	"Evarini Choosthu Unnaa"	Sirivennela Sitarama Sastry	S. P. Balasubrahmanyam, K. S. Chithra	4:55
Total length:				29:24
