= Mathar Kula Manikkam =

1956 film by T. Prakash Rao

- Theatrical release poster
- Directed by: T. Prakash Rao
- Written by: C. V. Sridhar (dialogues)
- Screenplay by: Vempati Sadasivabrahmam
- Based on: Noukadubi by Rabindranath Tagore
- Produced by: A. Shankara Reddy
- Starring: Gemini Ganesan; Anjali Devi; Akkineni Nageswara Rao; Savitri
- Cinematography: P. L. Roy
- Edited by: N. M. Shankar
- Music by: S. Rajeswara Rao
- Production company: Lalitha Films
- Distributed by: Vahini Studios
- Release date: 20 December 1956
- Running time: 197 minutes
- Country: India
- Language: Tamil

Mathar Kula Manikkam (transl. A gem among women) is a 1956 Indian Tamil-language drama film directed by T. Prakash Rao. The film stars Gemini Ganesan, Akkineni Nageswara Rao, Anjali Devi and Savitri, with music composed by S. Rajeswara Rao. The film is a remake of Naresh Chandra Mitra's 1947 Bengali film Noukadubi, which itself is based on Rabindranath Tagore's 1906 eponymous novel. The screenplay and dialogue were written by Vempati Sadasivabrahmam and C. V. Sridhar, respectively. The film was simultaneously made in Telugu under the title Charana Daasi, both versions were critical and commercial successes.

== Cast ==
Cast according to the opening credit of the film

Male cast

- Gemini Ganesan as Chandrasekar
- A. Nageswara Rao as Ravi
- S. V. Ranga Rao
- K. A. Thangavelu
- D. Balasubramaniam
- K. Sarangapani
- Kaka Radhakrishnan
- Friend Ramasami
- Balaji
- C. V. V. Panthulu
- M. A. Ganapathi Bhat
- M. S. Natarajan
- K. M. S. Mani

Female cast

- Anjali Devi as Parvathi
- Savithri as Lakshmi
- P. Kannamba
- M. N. Rajam
- K. R. Chellam
- S. D. Subbulakshmi

Dance

- Kamala Lakshmanan
- Ragini
- Rita

== Production ==
The film is based on Rabindranath Tagore's novel, The Wreck. The director T. Prakash Rao chose to replace the boat crash sequence in the novel with a train accident in the film, inspired by a real event that took place near Ariyalur. C. V. Sridhar, then an up-and-coming writer, was recruited as the dialogue writer. The film was shot simultaneously in Tamil and Telugu languages, with the Telugu version titled Charana Daasi. Mathar Kula Manikkam was the only Tamil film in which Anjali Devi and Savitri co-starred.

== Soundtrack ==
The soundtrack was composed by S. Rajeswara Rao.

Songs	Singers	Lyrics	Length
"Anbe Enthan Vaazhvil"	Ghantasala & P. Leela	Thanjai N. Ramaiah Dass	02:13
"Malaiyae Asainthalum.... Shanthi Ethu Vazhvile"	T. M. Soundararajan	Thanjai N. Ramaiah Dass	04:01
"Ye Manitha.... Bommalattamithu"	T. M. Soundararajan	Thanjai N. Ramaiah Dass	04:13
"Boologamada Idhu Boologamada"	T. M. Soundararajan	Thanjai N. Ramaiah Dass	04:10
"Payaname Kadduvom"	Tiruchi Loganathan	Thanjai N. Ramaiah Dass	04:03
"Naalum Nalla Naalu"	Tiruchi Loganathan & A. P. Komala	Thanjai N. Ramaiah Dass	07:12
"Thean Idhazh Meley"	Jikki	Thanjai N. Ramaiah Dass	03:12
"Enkke Tharamaadi"	V. N. Sundharam	Thanjai N. Ramaiah Dass	02:15
"Yennintha Jaalamada"	P. Leela	Thanjai N. Ramaiah Dass	03:48
"Sri Lalitha Dhayabhariyae"	P. Leela	Thanjai N. Ramaiah Dass	03:36
"Maasatru Uyarntha Maragathame"	P. S. Vaidhegi	Thanjai N. Ramaiah Dass	03:14
"Denjaru Aiyaa Denjaru"	T. V. Rathnam & G. Kasthoori	Udumalai Narayana Kavi	04:50
"Isaiyarase Kala Nidhiye"	P. Susheela	A. Maruthakasi	09:16
"Kaadhalin Jothi Idhe"	P. Susheela	A. Maruthakasi	04:08
"Inai Yedumillaa"	Ghantasala & P. Susheela	A. Maruthakasi	2:23
"Oho..Anathaiyai Paarai Un"	P. Susheela	A. Maruthakasi	2:42

== Release ==
Mathar Kula Manikkam and Charanadasi, the Tamil and Telugu versions respectively, were released the same year and were box-office successes. The former helped Gemini Ganesan and Anjali Devi establish a career in Tamil cinema.
