= Dak Ghar =

- Directed by: Zul Vellani
- Based on: The Post Office by Rabindranath Tagore
- Produced by: Children's Film Society
- Starring: Balraj Sahni; Mukri; Sachin
- Music by: Madan Mohan
- Release date: 1965
- Running time: 60 min
- Country: India
- Language: Hindi

Dak Ghar is a 1965 Indian Hindi-language film based on an eponymous 1912 play by Rabindranath Tagore. It was directed by Zul Vellani and starred Sachin, Mukri, AK Hangal, Sudha and Satyen Kappu among others, with cameo appearances by Balraj Sahni and Sharmila Tagore.

== Background ==
Dak Ghar (The Post Office) is a 1912 Bengali play by Rabindranath Tagore. W. B. Yeats produced an English-language version of the play and also wrote a preface to it. It was also translated into Spanish and French. It was performed in English for the first time in 1913 by the Irish Theatre in London with Tagore himself in attendance. The Bengali original was staged in Calcutta in 1917. It also had a successful run in Germany with performances in concentration camps during World War II. A Polish version was performed under the supervision of Janusz Korczak in the Warsaw Ghetto.

== Plot ==
Amal, a young boy with an incurable disease, is trapped inside the house by the local pandit-doctor's orders. He spends the day chattering with passersby and villagers while daydreaming about those encounters later. When the chowkidar tells him the new building across the road from his house is a new Post Office belonging to the Raja, Amal starts fantasising about visiting the King beyond the hills, and getting a letter or delivering the letters going all around, setting out from the confines of his house.

== Cast ==
- Sachin Pilgaonkar as Amal
- AK Hangal as Pandit-doctor
- Satyen Kappu as Madhabdutta, Amal's uncle (Pishemoshai in original play)
- Sudha as flower seller girl
- Balraj Sahni as Andhe Baba/Fakir (Thakurdas in original play)
- Mukri as Dahiwala (Doiwala in original play)

== Soundtrack ==
- "Jhan Jhan Baaje Iktaara, Raja Ka Mai Harakaara"... Sushma Shrestha
- "Kheli Hu Bahaaron Me, Bahaaron Me, Bahaaron Me Pali Hu Hu"...
- "Kyu Roj Akela Jaata Hai Ae Suraj Le Chal Saath Mujhe"... Bhupinder
- "Taaza Dahi Le Lo Taaza Dahi, Taaza Dahi Le Lo"... Shyam Vasvani
- "Ye Bhor Jahaan Se Aati Hai, Koi Mujhko Wahan Pahuncha Deta"... Bhupinder
