= The Religion of Man =

1931 compilation of lectures by Rabindranath Tagore

- Title page for The Religion of Man (1953 edition)
- Author: Rabindranath Tagore
- Publication date: 1931

The Religion of Man is a 1931 compilation of lectures by Rabindranath Tagore, edited by him and drawn largely from his Hibbert Lectures given at Oxford University in May 1930. A Brahmo playwright and poet of global renown, Tagore deals with largely universal themes of God, divine experience, illumination, and spirituality. A brief conversation between him and Albert Einstein, "Note on the Nature of Reality", is included as an appendix.

Another compilation of three lectures on roughly the same set of subjects, delivered in 1933 as his Kamala Lectures at the University of Calcutta, was published in Bengali under the same name (Bengali: মানুষের ধর্ম্ম).k1

== Contents of the Hibbert Lectures ==
- Preface
- I. Man's Universe
- II. The Creative Spirit
- III. The Surplus in Man
- IV. Spiritual Union
- V. The Prophet
- VI. The Vision
- VII. The Man of My Heart
- VIII. The Music Maker
- IX. The Artist
- X. Man's Nature
- XI. The Meeting
- XII. The Teacher
- XIII. Spiritual Freedom
- XIV. The Four Stages of Life
- XV. Conclusion

Appendix:

- I. The Baul Singers of Bengal
- II. Note on the Nature of Reality
- III. Dadu and the Mystery of Form
- IV. Night and Morning

Index
