= Charana Daasi =

1956 film

- Theatrical release poster
- Directed by: T. Prakash Rao
- Screenplay by: Vempati Sadasivabrahmam
- Based on: Noukadubi by Rabindranath Tagore
- Produced by: A. Sankara Reddy
- Starring: N. T. Rama Rao; Akkineni Nageswara Rao; Anjali Devi; Savitri
- Cinematography: P. L. Roy
- Edited by: N. M. Shankar
- Music by: S. Rajeswara Rao
- Production company: Lalitha Films
- Release date: 20 December 1956
- Running time: 196 minutes
- Country: India
- Language: Telugu

Charana Daasi (transl. Wife. literally, "a female servant at the feet") is a 1956 Indian Telugu-language drama film written by Vempati Sadasivabrahmam and directed by T. Prakash Rao. It stars N. T. Rama Rao, Akkineni Nageswara Rao, Anjali Devi and Savitri, and music composed by S. Rajeswara Rao. The film is a remake of Naresh Chandra Mitra's 1947 Bengali film Noukadubi, which itself is based on Rabindranath Tagore's 1906 eponymous novel. It was simultaneously made in Tamil as Mathar Kula Manikkam (1956).

== Cast ==
- N. T. Rama Rao as Dr. Chandra Sekhar
- Akkineni Nageswara Rao as Venu
- Anjali Devi as Parvathi
- Savitri as Lakshmi
- S. V. Ranga Rao as Raghavaiah
- Relangi as Mahesham
- Ramana Reddy as Narsu & Krishna (dual role)
- Govindarajula Subba Rao as Basavaiah
- Chadalavada as Hanumanthu
- Perumallu as Rangaiah
- Kannamba as Annapurna
- Sowcar Janaki as Saroja
- Suryakantam as Seshamma
- Hemalatha as Venu's mother
- Kamala Lakshman as Vasavadatta in Svapnavasavadattam Dance Drama
- Ragini as Dancer
- Ambika Sukumaran as Dancer

== Production ==
The film is based on Rabindranath Tagore's novel, Noukadubi. The director, T. Prakash Rao, chose to replace the boat crash sequence in the novel with a train accident in the film, inspired by a real event that took place near Ariyalur. The film was shot simultaneously in Telugu and Tamil languages, with the Tamil version titled Mathar Kula Manikkam.

== Soundtrack ==
Music was composed by S. Rajeswara Rao.

Song title	Lyrics	Singers	length
"Gulabeela"	Samudrala Sr	Ghantasala & P. Leela	2:07
"Aasalu Poochinavi"	Samudrala Sr.	P. Susheela	3:49
"Are Beta.... Bommalaata"	Vempati Sadasivabrahmam	Mallikarjuna Rao	3:14
"Gunde Raayi Chesuko"	B. V. N. Acharya	Madhavapeddi Satyam	3:42
"Ee Dayachaluna Raa"	Samudrala Sr.	P. Leela	3:41
"Regina Aasa"	Samudrala Sr.	Jikki	2:59
"Srilalitaa Dayaakalitaa"	BVN Acharya	P. Leela	3:03
"Badhalee Ayipoyindhe Bhamamani"	Kosaraju	Pithapuram Nageswara Rao	3:36
"Nede Kadaa Hayi"	Kosaraju	Madhavapeddi Satyam & Swarnalatha	3:32
"Maruvakumaa Manoramana"	BVN Acharya	P. Susheela	4:31
"Murisenu Lokalu Kanumaa"	Samudrala Sr.	Ghantasala & P. Susheela	2:23
"Oho Viyogini"	BVN Acharya	P. Susheela	2:42
"Yekkadunnadi"	Samudrala Sr.	Jikki & K. Rani	3:10
"Tharumaarulaadeveme Vayyaari"	Samudrala Sr.	V. N. Sundaram	2:15
"Dhushtudu Jooche Ninnu"	Samudrala Sr.	P. Susheela	
"Kantini Satyamu Nenee Reyi"	Samudrala Sr.	P. Leela	

== Release ==
Charanadasi and Mathar Kula Manikkam, the Telugu and Tamil versions, respectively, were released the same year and were box-office successes.
