= Sodh Bodh =

1942 Bengali film

Sodh Bodh (Repayment of Debt) is a 1942 Indian Bengali-language comedy drama film directed by Saumyen Mukherji. The film is based on the same name story by Rabindranath Tagore. It is the first cinematic adaptations of Tagore's literary works after his death in 1941.

== Plot ==
The film explores family relationships, misunderstandings and moral reconciliation through a satirical treatment of Bengali middle-class society.
