= Gora (film) =

1938 film based on a novel of Rabindranath Tagore

Gora is a Bengali drama film directed Naresh Mitra based on the 1909 novel of the same name by Rabindranath Tagore. This film was released on 30 July 1938. Music composer of the film was Kazi Nazrul Islam.

== Plot ==
Gora and Mahim were sons of Krishna Dayal. Binay, Gora's childhood friend introduced him to a Brahma family. Gora is very conscious about his Hinduism and he likes to represent himself as an orthodox Hindu. His Hinduism makes conflict with the Brahma religion.

== Cast ==
- Naresh Mitra as Haranbabu
- Jiban Ganguly as Gora
- Mohan Ghoshal as Binay
- Manoranjan Bhattacharya as Paresh Babu
- Bipin Gupta as Krishnadayal
- Ranibala as Radharani a.k.a. Sucharita
- Protima Dasgupta as Lalita
- Rajlakshmi Devi as Anandomoyee
- Devbala as Haramohini
- Manorama as Baradasundari
- Suhasini Devi
