= An Obsolete Altar =

- Directed by: Hyash Tanmoy, Mrigankasekhar Ganguly
- Written by: Hyash Tanmoy, Mrigankasekhar Ganguly
- Based on: Achalayatan by Rabindranath Tagore
- Produced by: Hyash Tanmoy
- Starring: Avinandan Bhadra, Anirban Paul
- Narrated by: Rabindranath Tagore
- Cinematography: Joydeep Banerjee
- Edited by: Mrigankasekhar Ganguly, Ansuman
- Music by: Inam Hussain
- Distributed by: Hyash Tanmoy from ZERO DEGREE ARTS
- Release date: 21 September 2013 (Eastern Breeze International Film Festival)
- Running time: 16 minutes
- Country: India
- Languages: English, Hindi, Bengali
- Budget: 500 INR

An Obsolete Altar is a 2013 short film is inspired by the 1912 play Achalayatan written by Rabindranath Tagore. The film has been officially selected for International competition as the only Indian film at the Eastern Breeze International Film Festival in Canada and Up and Coming Film Festival in Hannover, Germany, has selected the film, out of 2,982 films submitted from 54 countries.

== Plot ==
Rape is a social cancer. Women are victimized in everywhere. The country is roaring. The intellects are walking with candles. The government pays allowances to the victim. The opposition are taking advantage. The process of purgation has already started. The media get excited with the justice. But, what will happen if the victim is not a female?

== Cast ==
- Jagriti (Avinandan) Bhadra as Genital (It) Victim of rape
- Anirban Laulaa as Alter ego of Genital (It)
- Joydeep Banerjee as Panchak
- Mriganka sekhar Ganguly as Mahapanchak
- Anand Singh as Rapist
- Tannistha Bhattacharya as Journalist
- Satyajit Biswas as Intellect
- Arunava Barman as Allegorical Artist (Dancer)
- Subhasish Acharya as Allegorical Artist (Dancer)
- Swagata Das as Victim of rape
- Soumik Goswami as Allegorical Artist (Dancer)
- Biswajit Gayen as Allegorical Artist (Dancer)
- Sudipta Das as Allegorical Artist (Dancer)
- Saheli Das as Victim of rape
- Hyash Tanmoy as Photojournalist
