= Milan (1946 film) =

- Directed by: Nitin Bose
- Screenplay by: Sajanikanta Das
- Story by: Rabindranath Tagore
- Produced by: Hiten Chaudhary
- Starring: Dilip Kumar; Mira Misra
- Cinematography: Radhu Karmakar
- Edited by: Kali Raha
- Music by: Anil Biswas
- Production company: The Bombay Talkies Ltd.
- Release date: August 9, 1946
- Running time: 120 min
- Country: India
- Language: Hindi

Milan (transl. Union) is a 1946 Hindi-language drama film directed by Nitin Bose. The film starred Dilip Kumar, Mira Misra, Ranjana, Pahari Sanyal and Moni Chatterjee. It was an adaptation of Rabindranath Tagore's 1906 Bengali story Noukadubi (The Wreck). The screenplay adaptation was done by Sajanikanta Das with dialogues translated into Hindi by P. L. Santoshi. The film's music was composed by Anil Biswas and the lyrics written by P. L. Santoshi and Arzu Lakhnavi.

The story revolves around a young law student who is forced into an arranged marriage though he is in love with another woman. Following the wedding, the drama focuses on the bride's mistaken identity and the search for her husband.

== Story ==
The story is set in 1905. Ramesh (Dilip Kumar) is studying law in Calcutta and has just appeared for his final exams. He is a friend and neighbour of Jogen who is also studying law. Jogen (Shyam Laha) lives with his father Annada Babu (Moni Chatterjee) and sister Hemnalini (Ranjana). Ramesh and Hemnalini are fond of each other and Ramesh visits their house most days for tea. Their association is disliked by another friend Akshay (Pahari Sanyal) who also likes Hemnalini. Ramesh has been asked to come back to his village for the holidays by his father but is dissuaded from going by Hemnalini. Ramesh's father Braja Mohan (K. P. Mukherjee) is from the priestly caste and lives in the village. He receives an anonymous letter stating that his son is involved with the neighbour's daughter who comes from a tradesman caste and that he spends his entire time there. Braja Mohan goes to the city and brings Ramesh back with him to the village. He has arranged Ramesh's wedding with a poor widow's daughter. Ramesh tries to convince his father about his involvement with Hemnalini. His father after satisfying himself that Ramesh has as yet not committed himself to Hemnalini prevails upon Ramesh to marry Sushila because of the promise he had given to the girl's mother. There is a storm at night when the wedding party from the groom's side is returning to their village by boat. During the crossing the boat capsizes. Nearly all on the boat are drowned including Ramesh's father and Ramesh appears to be the only one to survive. He sees a woman in bridal dress lying unconscious on the bank. He brings her to his village but soon understands that this is a case of mistaken identity. She continuously checks him when he calls her Sushila and tells him her name is Kamala. He realises there was another bridal procession and their boat too had capsized.

After the formalities of his father's funeral service Ramesh decides to take Kamala to Calcutta. He finds out about her only living relative, an uncle, and writes to him. A letter arrives telling him of the death of Kamala's uncle but the sender has mentioned the husband's name and profession. His name is Nalin and he's a doctor. Ramesh starts searching for Dr. Nalin. He has made no mention of his marriage to Hemnalini or her family nor told anyone regarding the mistaken identity of his supposed bride to avoid any embarrassment to the girl.

On arrival in Calcutta, Ramesh suggests that Kamala get an education. After allaying her apprehension regarding her age he admits her in a girl's boarding school in the same city. Akshay's sister also studies in the same school and through her Akshay gets to know the truth about Ramesh's marriage. In the evening he questions Ramesh in front of Hemnalini. Ramesh deflects the question and asks Hem to trust him. Preparations are on at Annada's house for the wedding of Hemnalini and Ramesh. Their wedding is set for the coming Sunday but Ramesh is asked by the principal to take Kamala home for the weekend. Ramesh postpones the wedding and brings Kamala back from school. Akshay brings Jogen to Ramesh's house where they see Kamala and on being questioned Ramesh keeps silent. Hemnalini goes into a state of shock when she's told about Ramesh's wife. Her father takes her to Kashi to recuperate. Ramesh decides to leave Calcutta and he takes Kamala with him to Ghazipur. Kamala reads the letter Ramesh has written to Hem explaining the entire situation and mentioning Kamala's husband's name. She finally recognises the truth about her and Ramesh's situation. She decides to kill herself and leaves the house. She is rescued and comes under Nalin's mother's care. She realises that Nalin is her husband but finds out that Hem and he are to be betrothed. However, Nalin is not happy about the betrothal as he refuses to believe that Kamala is dead and wants to wait a while longer. Finally the truth comes out and she's accepted by her husband and his mother while Ramesh and Hemnalini get back together.

== Cast ==
- Dilip Kumar: Ramesh
- Mira Misra: Kamala
- Ranjana: Hemnalini
- Moni Chatterjee: Annada
- S. Nazeer : Nalianaksha
- Pahari Sanyal: Akshay
- Shyam Laha: Jogen
- K. P. Mukherjee : Braja Mohan (Ramesh's father)

== Production ==
Milan was Nitin Bose’s first directorial venture for Bombay Talkies banner after his shift from New Theatres in Calcutta (Kolkata) to Bombay (Mumbai). It was also Dilip Kumar's first film under The Bombay Talkies banner. Dilip Kumar who started his career with Jwar Bhata in (1944), had his acting groomed by Nitin Bose in this film. Dilip Kumar acknowledged this in an interview: "Nitin Bose became a friend after Milan and he changed the way I interpreted and studied my scripts and roles".

== Reception ==
According to one source the film was not a success but achieved critical acclaim for cinematographer R. Karmakar. However, another source called the film a success and one of the reasons cited was its music. The Box Office collections for 1946 were ₹2,500,000 (equivalent to ₹360 million or US$3.7 million in 2023) which in adjusted gross is more than ₹2,050,000,000 (equivalent to ₹290 billion or US$3.0 billion in 2023)

== Soundtrack ==
The composer was Anil Biswas and lyricists Pyare Lal Santoshi and Arzu Lakhnavi. Parul Ghosh who sang most of the songs in the film was Anil Biswas's younger sister and had the distinction of being one of the first recorded playback singer in the industry. Geeta Dutt was the other female singer in the film.

#	Title	Singer(s)	Lyricist
1	"Gungun Gungun Bole Bhanwarva"	Parul Ghosh	Pyare Lal Santoshi
2	"Upar Hai Badariya Kari"	Shankar Dasgupta	Pyare Lal Santoshi
3	"Suhani Beriyan Beet Jaayein"	Parul Ghosh	Arzu Lakhnavi
4	"Who Kahein Aap Ki"		Arzu Lakhnavi
5	"Main Kiski Laaj Nibhaoon"	Parul Ghosh	Arzu Lakhnavi
6	"Jisne Bana di Bansuri"	Parul Ghosh	Arzu Lakhnavi
7	"Chhan Mein Bajegi"	Geeta Dutt	Pyare Lal Santoshi
8	"Tumhe Saajan Manaye"	Geeta Dutt	Pyare Lal Santoshi

== See also ==
- Noukadubi (2011 film)
- Noukadubi (1947 film)
- Ghunghat (1960 film)
