= Noukadubi (2011 film) =

- Poster of the movie Noukadubi
- Directed by: Rituparno Ghosh
- Screenplay by: Rituparno Ghosh
- Based on: Noukadubi by Rabindranath Tagore
- Produced by: Subhash Ghai
- Starring: Prosenjit Chatterjee; Jisshu Sengupta; Raima Sen; Riya Sen
- Cinematography: Soumik Haldar
- Edited by: Arghyakamal Mitra
- Music by: Raja Narayan Deb
- Distributed by: Mukta Searchlight Films
- Release date: January 2011
- Running time: 126 minutes
- Country: India
- Language: Bengali

Noukadubi ("Boat wreck") is a Bengali film directed by Rituparno Ghosh, released in January 2011. The movie is a period film set in the 1920s, based on the 1906 novel by Rabindranath Tagore, although the credits claim that the film is 'inspired' by the Tagore novel because Rituparno Ghosh has taken the skeleton of the original story and woven it with his own inputs – cerebral and emotional.

The cast includes Prosenjit Chatterjee, Jisshu Sengupta, Raima Sen and Riya Sen. The art direction was by Indranil Ghosh. The film was also dubbed in Hindi and released in May 2011 under the name "Kashmakash". The film was produced by Subhash Ghai. Allegedly the Hindi version has been translated, dubbed and edited down by 30 minutes under Ghai's own guidance, without the director's involvement at all.

The original story by Tagore has been placed on celluloid several times including twice in Hindi – Milan (1946) directed by Nitin Bose with Dilip Kumar and Ghunghat (1960), directed by Ramanand Sagar with Bina Rai. Bengali versions came out in 1932, 1947 and 1979.

== Plot ==
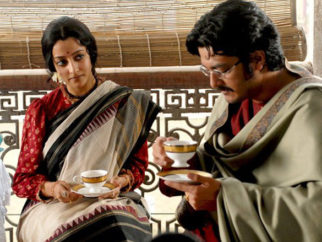
Raima Sen as Hemnalini and Jisshu Sengupta as Ramesh

A tender romance blossoming in early Kolkata between law student Ramesh and his friend's sister Hemnalini, is nipped suddenly when his father sends an urgent and mysterious summons from his village home. There, the dutiful son is peremptorily ordered to marry Susheela, daughter of a helpless widow. Ramesh refuses, confesses that his heart belongs to another. But the widow's fervent plea softens him ultimately. And he concedes, albeit with a heavy heart. The wedding takes place with due ceremony; and Ramesh sets out with his bride on a river boat journey back to Kolkata.

Soon a fierce storm arises; the boat tosses helplessly and finally capsizes in the churning waters. Later that night, Ramesh comes to his senses on a deserted shore under a starlit sky. Some distance away, he sees the unconscious form of a young bride. Her pulse is still beating, and in response to his voice calling 'Susheela' she opens her eyes at last. There is no one else in sight, alive or dead. The two move off, take a train to Kolkata, the bride wondering why they were not going to Kashi, but trusting his judgment implicitly.

Hem, his true love, knows nothing of all this. Ramesh has been missing from the evening of her birthday party. They have learnt of his hasty departure from the city, but nothing else. Though she pines inwardly, she is confident that he will return soon.

Back in Ramesh's new home in Kolkata, the facts of mistaken identity gradually come to light. She is Kamala not Susheela. Her husband is a doctor named Nalinaksha Chatterjee. Ramesh writes an advertisement to trace his whereabouts; but he does not have the heart to break this news to the helpless trusting young girl in his care. He puts her into a boarding school instead. But soon, Hem's would be suitor Akshay discovers Ramesh's secret and brings proof positive to Hem. Ramesh, unable to handle such a scandal, seeks hiding in Gorakhpur with Kamala. A devastated Hem is brought to Kashi by her father to help her forget. There she meets Nalinaksha and they warm up to each other.

In the meanwhile, having read the advertisement in an old newspaper, Kamala realizes the enormity of the lie she has been living, and walks out determined to drown herself in the river. Ramesh returns and finds her suicide note, searches everywhere to no avail. He does not know that she has been rescued by a courtesan and deposited in Kashi under Nalinaksha's mother's care. Kamala now sees her real husband for the first time, but cannot speak up, for he is betrothed to Hem.

Finally, the advertisement she keeps knotted in her saree is discovered, and the whole truth comes to light. Ramesh finally traces Nalinaksha and arrives at his house.

The story raises many questions of head and heart and the validity or otherwise of social conventions. The viewers are left wondering whether true love will finally triumph.

== Cast ==
- Prosenjit Chatterjee as Nalinaksha Chattopadhyay
- Jisshu Sengupta as Rameshchandra Chowdhury
- Raima Sen as Hemnalini
- Riya Sen as Kamala
- Dhritiman Chatterjee as Annodababu, Hemnalini's father
- Laboni Sarkar as Sushila's mother
- Ammu Chatterjee as Nalinaksha's mother (voice Rituparno Ghosh)
- Sumanta Mukherjee as Ramesh's father

== Reception ==
The premiered as the opening film of the Indian Panorama section during the 41st International Film Festival of India (IFFI), Goa on 24 November 2010, in the year that marked Rabindranath Tagore's 150th birth anniversary. It later had its commercial release in January 2011.

The film reviews were generally positive. Pratim D. Gupta of The Telegraph called Noukadubi "an enriching ride on stranger tides" and wrote "on the surface, this sexless love game may come across as tepid and tame, slow and sombre compared to the roller-coaster passion play that was Chokher Bali, but Noukadubi’s charm lies in the lingering aftertaste, the enduring pleasure in the pain".

== Accolades ==
Award Ceremony	Category	Recipient	Result	Ref.(s)
4th Mirchi Music Awards	Raag-Inspired Song of the Year	Khoya Kya	Won	
59th National Film Awards	Best Art Direction	Indranil Ghosh	Won	
