= The Post Office (play) =

Play by Rabindranath Tagore

- Original language: Bengali
- Written by: Rabindranath Tagore
- Characters: Madhav Dutt; Amal, his adopted nephew Gaffer (In disguise of a Fakir, Act 2); Sudha, a little flower-gatherer Troop of boys Doctor; Dairyman; Watchman; Village Headman, a bully King's Herald; Royal Physician; Boys
- Setting: Contemporary rural Bengal

The Post Office (Bengali: Dak Ghar) is a 1912 play by Rabindranath Tagore. It concerns Amal, a child confined to his adoptive uncle's home by an incurable disease. W. Andrew Robinson and Krishna Dutta note that the play "continues to occupy a special place in Tagore's reputation, both within Bengal and in the wider world." It was written in four days.

Amal stands in Madhav's courtyard and talks to passers-by, and asks in particular about the places they go. The construction of a new post office nearby prompts the imaginative Amal to fantasize about receiving a letter from the King or being his postman. The village headman mocks Amal, and pretends the illiterate child has received a letter from the king promising that his royal physician will come to attend him. The physician really does come, with a herald to announce the imminent arrival of the king; Amal, however, dies as Sudha comes to bring him flowers.

W. B. Yeats was the first person to produce an English-language version of the play; he also wrote a preface to it. It was performed in English for the first time in 1913 by the Abbey Theatre in Dublin, directed by W. B. Yeats and Lady Gregory; this production transferred to the Court Theatre, London, later the same year. The Bengali original was staged at Tagore's Jorasanko theatre in Calcutta in 1917. It had a successful run in Germany with 105 performances and its themes of liberation from captivity and zest for life resonated in its performances in concentration camps where it was staged during World War II. Juan Ramón Jiménez translated it into Spanish; it was translated into French by André Gide and read on the radio the night before Paris fell to the Nazis. A Polish version was performed under the supervision of Janusz Korczak in the Warsaw Ghetto.

== See also ==
- Dak Ghar, film adaptation
