= Noukadubi =

Novel by Rabindranath Tagore

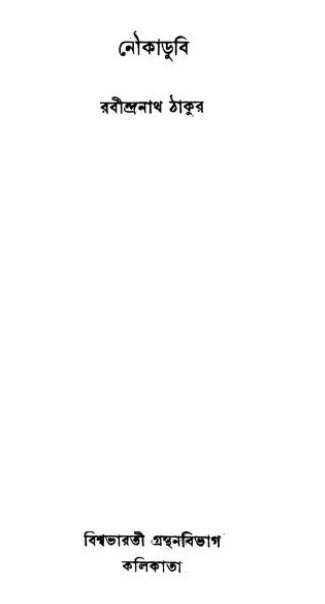
- Author: Rabindranath Tagore
- Original title: নৌকাডুবি (Boat wreck)
- Language: Bengali
- Genre: Novel
- Publisher: Bangadarshan
- Publication date: 1906
- Publication place: India

Noukadubi (Bengali: নৌকাডুবি, Boat wreck) is a 1906 Bengali novel by Rabindranath Tagore. It was first published in Bangadarshan, a Bengali literary magazine edited by Tagore himself at the time.

== Characters ==
The characters of this novel are:

- Ramesh
- Hemnalini
- Kamala
- Nalinaksha
- Annadababu
- Yogendra
- Akshay
- Umesh
- Chakravarti
- Shailaja

== Adaptations ==
- Milan (1946)
- Noukadubi (1947)
- Mathar Kula Manickam (1956)
- Charana Daasi (1956)
- Ghunghat (1960)
- Noukadubi (1979)
- Oka Chinna Maata (1997)
- Noukadubi (2011)
- Agni pareeksha Malayalam film ( 1968)
