= Noukadubi (1947 film) =

1947 film by Naresh Chandra Mitra

Noukadubi (transl. Boat wreck) is a 1947 Indian Bengali-language drama film directed by Naresh Chandra Mitra based on Rabindranath Tagore's 1906 novel of the same name. This film was released on 19 September 1947 under the Bombay Talkies banner. The novel was previously filmed in 1946 in Hindi as Milan. Noukadubi was among the big Bengali grossers of 1947.

== Plot ==
The story revolves around Ramesh's life. He is a young law student who is forced into an arranged marriage despite being in love with somebody else. Following the wedding, the drama focuses on the bride's mistaken identity and the search for her husband.

== Cast ==
- Pahari Sanyal as Father of Hemnalini
- Abhi Bhattacharya as Ramesh
- Meera Mishra as Kamala
- Biman Bandyopadhyay as Akhay
- Shyam Laha as Kamala's husband
- Mani Chatterjee
- Priti Majumdar
- Sunalini Devi
- Gayatri Debi
- Upen Chattopadhyay
- Iti Chakraborty
