= List of works by Rabindranath Tagore =

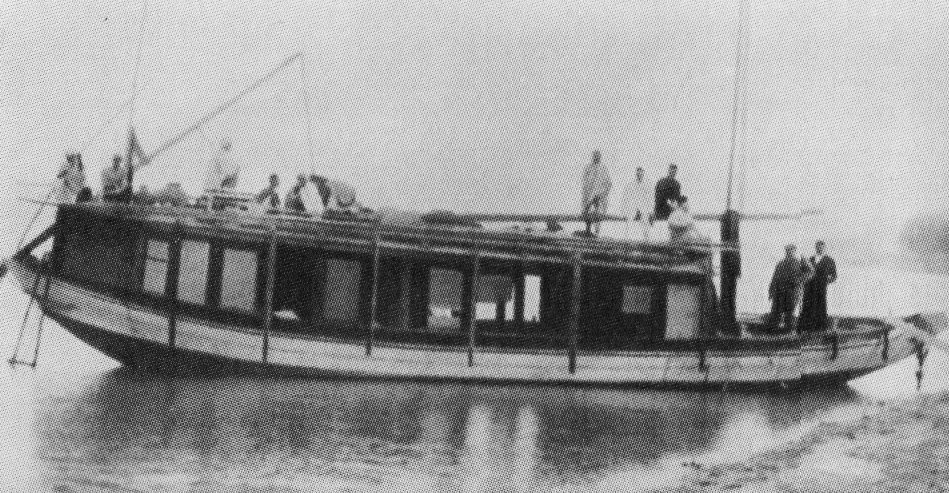
The Padma, the houseboat ("Bajra") of the Tagore family, at Shilaidaha Kuthibadi, where Tagore wrote many of his short stories and other works.

Below is a chronological list of works by Rabindranath Tagore between 1877 and 1941. Tagore wrote most of his short stories, novels, drama, poems and songs in Bengali; later he translated some of them into English.

== List of works ==
With many of Tagore's stories, there has been more than one translation by more than one translator. For instance, The Supreme Night, One Night and A Single Night are all translations of the same story. Note that not all translations are of the same quality. Tagore wrote approximately 2,232 songs. In the below list, only the most notable are shown.

Works by Rabindranath Tagore
Type	Year	Bengali title	English translation(s)
Short story	1877	Bhikarini	The Beggar Woman; The Beggar Girl
Short story	1877–1878	Korunna (or Karuna)	
Poetry	1878	Kabi-Kahini	The Tale of the Poet
Letters	1879	Yurop Prabasir Patra	Letters from an expatriate in Europe; Letters of a sojourner in Europe; Letters of a visitor to Europe; Letters of an exile in Europe
Poetry	1877	Bana-Phul	The Flower of the Woods
Musical drama	1881	Valmiki Pratibha	The Genius of Valmiki
Lecture	1881	Sangeet o Bhab	Music and Feeling
Poetry	1881	Bhagna Hriday	The Broken Heart
Poetry	1881	Sandhya Sangeet	Evening Songs
Poetry	1881	Prabhat Sangeet	Morning Songs
Drama	1881	Rudrachanda	
Musical drama	1882	Kal Mrigaya	The Fatal Hunt
Novel	1883	Bou Thakuranir Haat	The Young Queen's Market
Essays	1883	Bibidha Prashanga	Miscellaneous Topics
Drama	1884	Nalini	
Drama	1884	Prakritir Pratisodh	Nature's Revenge
Poetry	1884	Bhanusimha Thakurer Padabali	The Songs of Bhanushingho Thakur
Poetry	1884	Shaishab Sangeet	Poems of Childhood
Poetry	1884	Chhabi o Gan	Pictures and Songs
Songs	1885	Rabi Chhaya	The Shadow of the Sun
Essays	1885	Alochona	Discussions
Pamphlet	1885	Rammohan Roy	A pamphlet on Ram Mohan Roy
Poetry	1886	Kari o Komal	Sharps and Flats
Short story	1886	Ghater Katha (or Rajpathar Katha)	The Ghat's Story; The River Stairs (Note: Mashi and Other Stories (1918) at Project Gutenberg); The Bathing Ghat's Tale
Novel	1887	Rajarshi	The Royal Sage
Essays	1888	Samalochana	Reviews
Musical drama	1888	Mayar Khela	The Play of Illusions
Drama	1889	Raja o Rani	King and Queen
Drama	1890	Visarjan (or Bisarjan; adaptation of Rajarshi)	Sacrifice
Poetry	1890	Manasi	The Heart's Desire; Mental Images
Lecture	1890	Mantri Abhishek	Lecture on Lord Cross's India Bill
Travelogue	1891	Europe Jatrir Diary (part I)	Diary of a traveller to Europe
Short story	1891	Byabadhan (or Byabodhan)	The Rift; The Divide
Short story	1891 (probably)	Khata	Exercise-book; The Copybook; The Notebook
Short story	1891	Ginni	The Matronly Boy; The Housewife
Short story	1891	Khokababur Pratyabartan	Little Master's Return; Return of the Little Master; The Return of Khokababu; The Child's Return (Note: Stories from Tagore (1918) at Project Gutenberg); My Lord, the Baby (Note: The Hungry Stones (1916) at Project Gutenberg)
Short story	1891	Post Master	The Postmaster
Short story	1891	Denapaona (or Dena-Paona or Dena-Paaona)	The Matrimonial Deal; Profit and Loss; Debts and Dues
Short story	1891	Taraprasanner Kirti	Taraprasanna's Achievement; Taraprasanna's Fame; Taraprasanna's Masterpiece
Short story	1891–1892	Sampatti Samarpan	A Bequest of Property; Wealth Surrendered; The Trust Property
Short story	1892	Daliya	Dalia
Short story	1892	Ekti Ashare Golpo (or Ekta Asharhe Galpa or Tasher Desh)	A Tale of Fantasy; A Fanciful Story; An Absurd Story; The Kingdom of Cards
Short story	1892	Svarnamrig (or Swarnamriga)	The Golden Deer; Fool's Gold; The Golden Mirage; The Fugitive Gold
Short story	1892	Kabuliwallah	The Pedlar from Kabul; Kabuliwallah; Kabuliwala; Kabuli; The Fruitseller
Short story (ghost story)	1892	Jibita o Mrita	The Living and the Dead; Alive and Dead; Living or Dead?
Short story	1892	Ek Ratri	A Single Night; The Supreme Night; One Night
Short story (ghost story)	1892	Kankal (or Konkaal)	The Skeleton; A Study in Anatomy
Short story	1892	Joy Parajay (or Joy Porajoy)	The Victory
Short story	1892	Subha (or Shuvashini)	The Silent Girl; Subha; The Dumb Girl
Short story	1892	Tyaga (or Tyag or Tyaag)	The Renunciation; Outcast; Sacrifice
Short story	1892–1893	Chuti (or Chhuti)	Holiday; The School Closes; The Home-Coming
Drama	1892	Goray Galad (or Goday Galad)	Wrong at the Start
Drama	1892	Chitrangada	Emancipation
Travelogue	1893	Europe Jatrir Diary (part II)	Diary of a traveller to Europe
Lecture	1893	Ingrej o Bharatbashi	The Englishmen and the Indians
Short story	1893	Shamapti (or Samapti)	The Ending; The Conclusion
Short story	1893	Sampadak	The Editor
Short story	1893	Samasya Paran (or Samasyapuran)	A Problem Solved; The Solution of the Problem; The Riddle Solved
Short story	1893	Shasti (or Sasti)	Punishment; The Sentence
Short story	1893	Asambhava Katha (or Asombhob Katha)	Once there was a King
Short story	1893	Daan Pratidan (or Danprotidan or Daan-Pratidaan)	Reciprocation; Gift and Return
Short story	1893	Madhyabartini	The Intervening Woman; The Girl Between; The In-between Girl
Songs	1893	Ganer Bahi o Valmiki Pratibha	Collection of songs incorporating Valmiki Pratibha
Short story	1894	Anadhikar Prabes	Forbidden Entry; Trespass; The Trespass
Short story (ghost story)	1894	Nisithe (or Nishithe)	At Dead of Night; In the Middle of the Night; At Midnight; In the Night
Short story	1894	Bicharok (or Bicarak)	Judge
Short story	1894	Prayascitta (or Prayashchitta or Prayaschita)	Atonement
Dance drama	1894	Biday Abhshap	Farewell Curse
Poetry	1895	Sonar Tari	The Golden Boat
Nursery rhymes	1895	Chhele-bhulano Chhara	
Short story (ghost story)	1895	Kshudhita Pashaan (or Ksudita Pasan or Khudito Pashan)	Hungry Stones; Hungry Stone; The Hunger of Stones; The Hungry Stones; The Spirit of the Marble Palace
Short story	1895	Didi	Elder Sister; The Elder Sister
Short story	1895	Manbhanjan	Resentment Appeased; Fury Appeased; Appeasement; Giribala
Short story	1895	Atithi	The Visitor; Visitor; Guest; The Guest; The Wandering Guest; The Runaway
Short story	1895	Thakurda	Grandfather; Thakurda; The Babus of Nayanjore
Short story	1895	Apad (or Aapad, or Apada)	Nuisance; The Nuisance; Unwanted; The Troublemaker; The Castaway
Short story	1895	Icchapuran (or Ichchhapuran)	Wish-fulfilment; Wishes Granted
Drama	1896	Malini	Malini
Poetry	1896	Chitra	
Poetry	1896	Chaitali	
Poem	1896	Nadi	River
Text book	1896	Sanskrita Siksha (part I and II)	
Essays	1897	Pancha Bhut	Five Elements
Drama	1897	Baikunther Khata	Manuscripts of Baikuntha
Drama	1897	Laksmirpariksa	The Trial
Short story	1898	Adhyapak (or Adhayapok)	Professor
Short story	1898	Detective	The Detective
Short story (ghost story)	1898	Manihara (or Monihara)	Woman Bereft of Jewels; The Lost Jewels; Missing My Bejeweled
Short story (ghost story)	1898	Durasa (or Durasha)	Forlorn Hope; False Hope; False Hopes; A Shattered Dream
Short story	1898	Rajtika	The Royal Mark; Royal Mark; The Raj Seal; We Crown Thee King
Short story	1898	Putrayajna	Fertility Sacrifice; Son-sacrifice
Short story	1898–1899	Dristidan (or Drishtidan)	The Gift of Sight; The Gift of Vision
Poetry	1899	Kanika	A collection of short poems and epigrams
Short story	1900	Subhadristi	The Auspicious Vision
Short story	1900	Sadar o Andar	Raja and Rani
Short story	1900	Uddhar	Saved
Short story	1900	Durbuddhi	Folly; Thoughtlessness; A Lapse of Judgement
Short story	1900		Failure; Fail; F is for Fail
Short story	1900	Pratibesini (or Protibeshini)	My Fair Neighbour
Drama	1900	Kahini	Tales
Poetry	1900	Kshanika	The Fleeting One
Poetry	1900	Kalpana	Imagination
Songs	1900	Katha	Stories
Essay	1900	Brahma Upanishad	A religious essay
Essay	1901	Aupanishad Brahma	A religious essay
Essay	1901	Brahma-mantra	A religious essay
Novel	1901	Nastanirh (or Nashtaneer or Nashtanir)	The Broken Nest
Novel	1901	Chokher Bali	A Grain of Sand; Speck in the Eye; Eye Sore
Poetry	1901	Naibedya	Offerings
Text book	1901	Bangla Kriyapader Taalika	List of Bengali verbs
Poetry	1903	Shishu	Child
Poem	1903	Birpurush	Hero (Note: The Crescent Moon (1913 poetry collection at Project Gutenberg)
Short story	1903	Darpaharan (or Darpa Haran)	Pride Surrendered
Short story	1903	Karmaphal (or Kormo Fol)	Nemesis
Novel	1904	Chirakumar Sabha (or Cira Kuma Sabha; later published as Prajapatir Nirbandha)	The Bachelor's Club
Text book	1904	Ingraji Sopan (Part I)	
Song	1905	Amar Sonar Bangla	My Golden Bengal
Song	1905	Ekla Chalo Re	If no one responds to your call, then go your own way alone
Songs	1905	Baul	
Essays	1905	Atmasakti	Collection of political essays and lectures
Novel	1906	Noukadubi (or Nauka Dubi)	The Wreck; Ship Wreck; Boat Accident
Poetry	1906	Kheya	Ferry
Essays	1906	Bharatbarsha	India (collection of political essays and lectures)
Essay	1906	Deshnayak	Political essay
Essay	1906	Rajbhakti	Political essay
Text book	1906	Ingraji Sopan (Part II)	
Short story	1907	Gupta Dhon (or Guptadhan)	Hidden Treasure; The Hidden Treasure; Buried Treasure
Short story	1907	Master Moshayi (also Mastermoshai or Master Mashai)	Master Mashai; Mr. Teacher
Essays	1907	Sahitya	Literature
Essays	1907	Prachin Sahitya	Ancient Literature
Essays	1907	Adhunik Sahitya	Modern Literature
Essays	1907	Loka Sahitya	Literature of the People
Essays	1907	Bichitra Prabandha	
Essays	1907	Charitrapuja	Tributes to Great Lives
Sketches	1907	Hasya-Kautuk	
Sketches	1907	Byanga-Kautuk	
Essays	1908	Raja Praja	The King and his Subjects (collection of political essays)
Essays	1908	Samuha	Collection of political essays
Essays	1908	Swadesh	My Country (collection of political and sociological essays)
Essays	1908	Swamaj	Society
Essay	1908	Path o Patheya	Ends and Means
Drama	1908	Sharadotsab (or Sharadotsav)	Autumn Festival
Drama	1908	Mukut	The Crown
Songs	1908	Gan	
Songs	1909	Brahma Sangeet	
Songs	1909	Dharma Sangeet	
Essays	1909	Dharma	
Essays	1909	Vidyasagar-charit	Two essays on Ishwar Chandra Vidyasagar printed before in Charitrapuja
Essays	1909	Sabdatattwa	On Bengali philology
Drama	1909	Prayschitta	Penance
Poetry	1909	Chayanika	An anthology of poems
Novel	1909	Gora	Fair-Faced
Short story	1910	Rasmanir Chhele	Rasmani's Son; Rashmoni's Son; The Son of Rashmani
Drama	1910	Raja	The King of the Dark Chamber (Note: The King of the Dark Chamber (1910 drama) at Project Gutenberg)
Poetry	1910	Gitanjali	
Poem	1910	Chitto Jetha Bhayshunyo	Where the Mind is Without Fear
Song	1911	Bharot Bhagyo Bidhata (includes Jana Gana Mana)	Dispenser of the Destiny of India
Memoirs	1911	Jivan Smriti	My Reminiscences (Note: My Reminiscences (1912 memoirs) at Project Gutenberg)
Drama	1912	Dak Ghar	The Post Office (Note: The Post Office (1912 drama) at Project Gutenberg)
Drama	1912	Achalayatan	The Immovable
Poetry	1912		Gitanjali (Song Offerings) (103 poems translated by Tagore from Gitanjali (51), Gitimalya (17), Naivedya (16), Kheya (11), Sishu (3), Chaitali (1), Smaran (1), Kalpana (1), Utsarga (1), Achalayatana (1)) (Note: Gitanjali (1912 poetry collection) at Project Gutenberg)
Letters	1912	Chhinnapatra	Glimpses of Bengal (Note: Glimpses of Bengal - Letters 1885-1895 at Project Gutenberg); Torn Leaves
Essay	1912	Dharmasiksha	
Essay	1912	Dharmer Adhikar	
Text book	1912	Patha Sanchay	
Essays	1913		Sadhana: The Realisation of Life (Note: Sadhana: The Realisation of Life (1913 essays) at Project Gutenberg)
Poetry	1913		The Gardener (poems translated by Tagore from Kshanika, Kalpana, Sonar Tari, Chaitali, Utsarga, Chitra, Manasi, Mayar Khela, Khaya, Kari o Kamal, Gitali and Saradotsav) (Note: The Gardener (1913 poetry collection) at Project Gutenberg)
Poetry	1913		The Crescent Moon (40 poems translated by Tagore)
Drama	1913		Chitra (translation of Chitrangada) (Note: Chitra (1913 play) at Project Gutenberg)
Dance drama	1914	Chitra	
Poetry	1914	Gitimalya	A Garland of Songs
Poetry	1914	Gitali	
Poetry	1914	Utsarga	Dedication
Short story	1914	Boshtomi (or Bostomi)	The Devotee; The Baishnav Woman
Short story	1914	Haimanti	Haimanti: Of Autumn
Short story	1914	Shesher Ratri	Last Night; Mashi
Short story	1914	Strir Patra (or Streer Patra)	A Wife's Letter; The Wife's Letter
Translation	1915		Songs of Kabir (Note: Songs of Kabir (1915 translation) at Project Gutenberg)
Poetry and drama	1915	Kavyagrantha	Ten volumes
	1915	Bichitra Path	Selection for the use of students
Short story	1916	Aparichita (or Aparichita)	The Inscrutable Woman; The Unknown Woman; Woman Unknown
Poetry	1916	Balaka	The Flight of Cranes; A Flight of Swans; Wild Geese; The Swan
Poetry	1916		Fruit-Gathering (poems translated by Tagore from Gitali, Gitimalya, Balaka, Utsarga, Katha, Kheya, Smarana, Chitra etc.) (Note: Fruit-Gathering (1916 poetry collection) at Project Gutenberg)
Poetry	1916		Stray Birds (325 epigrams) (Note: Stray Birds (1916 poetry collection) at Project Gutenberg)
Novel	1916	Chaturanga	Chaturanga; Quartet; Broken Ties
Novel	1916	Ghare Baire	The Home and the World (Note: The Home and the World (1916 novel) at Project Gutenberg)
Drama	1916	Phalguni	Cycle of Spring (Note: The Cycle of Spring (1916 drama) at Project Gutenberg)
Essays	1916	Sanchaya	
Lecture	1916		The Spirit of Japan (Note: The Spirit of Japan (1916 lecture) at Project Gutenberg)
Short story	1917	Patra o Patri	In Quest of a Bride; Bride and Bridegroom
Short story	1917	Tapaswini (or Taposwini)	The Austere Woman; The Austere Wife
Lecture	1917	Kartar Ichchhay Karma	As the Master Wills
Lectures	1917		Personality (lectures delivered in America)
Text book	1917	Anubad-charcha	
Short story	1918	Tota Kahini	The Parrot's Training
Short story	1918	Ghoda (or Ghora)	The Trial of the Horse
Short story	1918	Kartar Bhut	Old Man's Ghost
Poetry	1918	Palataka	The Runaway (stories in verse)
Poetry	1918		Crossing (from Naivedya, Kheya, Gitanjali, Gitimalya and Gitali)
Poetry	1918		Lover's Gift (from Naivedya, Kheya, Gitanjali, Gitimalya and Gitali)
Drama	1918	Guru	Stage version of Achalayatan
Essays	1918		Nationalism (in the West, Japan and India) (Note: Nationalism (1918 essays) at Project Gutenberg)
Essay	1919		The Centre of Indian Culture
Travelogue	1919	Japan Jatri	Travel in Japan
Short story	1920	Poila Nombor (or Poila Nambar or Payla Nambar)	House Number One
Drama	1920	Arupratan	Stage version of Raja
Drama	1921	Rinsodh	Stage version of Saradotsav
Short story	1921	Notun Potul	New Doll
Short story	1921	Bhul Swarga	The Wrong Heaven
Poetry	1921		Fugitive (Note: The Fugitive (1921 poetry collection) at Project Gutenberg)
Essays	1921		Thought Relics (short meditative texts)
Lectures	1921		Greater India (four lectures 1902-1908)
Lecture	1921	Sikshar Milan	Meeting of Cultures
Lecture	1921	Satyer Ahovaan	Call of Truth
Dance drama	1921	Barsa-mangal	Rain Festival; Welcome to the Rains
Poetry	1922	Lipika	Letter
Poetry	1922	Sishu Bholanath	
Drama	1922	Muktadhara	The Waterfall
Lectures	1922		Creative Unity (Note: Creative Unity (1922 lectures) at Project Gutenberg)
Musical drama	1923	Boshonto	Spring
Drama	1923	Bisharjan	
Drama	1924	Raktakaravi	Red Oleanders (or Blood Oleanders) (Note: Red Oleanders (1924 drama), Tagoreweb)
Essay	1925		The Cult of the Charkha
Poetry	1925	Purabi	
Poetry	1925	Sankalan	
Drama	1925	Griha Prabesh	
Musical drama	1925	Sesh Barshan	The Last Shower
Songs	1926	Prabahini	
Poetry (epigrams)	1926	Lekhon	Fireflies; Autographs
Comedy	1926	Sodh Bodh	All Square
Drama	1926	Chirakumar Sabha	Stage version of Prajapatir Nirbandha
Dance drama	1926	Natir Puja	The Dancing Girl's Worship
Dance drama	1926	Nataraj	The King of Dance
Dance drama	1927	Riturangashala	The Play of the Seasons
Drama	1926–1929	Shesh Raksha (or Sesh Raksha)	Stage version of Goray Galad (The Last-Ditch Dave or Saved at Last)
Travelogue	1927	Java Jatrir Patra	Letters from Java
Short story	1928	Shangskar (or Sanskar)	The Patriot; Purification; Ritual and Reform
Short story	1928	Bolai	Nature's Child; Balai; Bolai
Lecture	1928	Palliprakriti	On the anniversary of Sriniketan
Short story	1929	Chitrakar (or Chitrokor)	The Artist
Novel	1929	Jogajog (or Yogayog)	Relationships; Crosscurrents; Nexus
Novel	1929	Shesher Kobita	Farewell Song; Farewell, My Friend; The Last Poem
Drama	1929	Paritran	Stage version of Prayaschitta
Drama	1929	Tapati	
Poetry	1929	Mahua	
Poetry	1929		Sheaves
Travelogue	1929	Ratri	Traveller
Lecture	1929		The Philosophy of Leisure
Text book	1930	Sahaj Path (parts I & II)	
Text book	1930	Ingreji Sahaj Siksha (parts I & II)	
Text book	1930	Patha Parichay (parts II -IV)	
Dance drama	1931	Shap Mochan	
Drama	1931	Nabeen	
Poetry	1931	Banabani	
Lectures	1931	Manusher Dhormo	The Religion of Man
Songs	1931–1932	Gitabitan (sorted chronologically)	Garden of Songs
Travelogue	1931	Russiar Chithi (or Rashiar Chithi)	Letters from Russia
Travelogue	1932	Parashya Jatri	Journey to Persia
Film	1932	Natir Puja (a recording of the 1926 stage dance-drama)	The Dancing Girl's Worship
Drama	1932	Kaler Jatra	
Poetry	1932	Parisesh	
Poetry	1932	Punascha	
Lecture	1932		Man the Artist
Short story	1933	Choraidhon (or Chorai Dhan)	The Stolen Treasure
Dance drama	1933	Tasher Desh	Land of Cards (based on the 1892 short story Ekti Ashare Golpo); Kingdom of Cards
Drama	1933	Bansari	The Flute
Drama	1933	Chandalika	The Untouchable Woman
Novel	1933	Dui Bon	Two Sisters
Novel	1934	Malancha	The Garden; The Arbour
Novel	1934	Char Adhyay (or Char Odhay)	Four Chapters
Songs	1934	Sraban Gatha	
Poetry	1934–1935	Bithika	Avenue
Poetry	1935	Shes Saptak	
Poetry	1935–1936	Patraput	
Poetry	1936	Shyamali	
Dance drama	1936	Chitrangada	
Songs	1936	Swarabitan (64 volumes until 1955; with musical scores)	
Essays	1936	Chhanda	Essays on Bengali prosody
Poetry	1937	Khapchhara	
Poetry	1937	Chharar Chhobi	
Essays	1937	Visva-Parichay	
Essays	1937	Kalantar	
Article	1937	Biswaparichay	Article on modern astronomy
Poetry	1938	Senjuti	
Poetry	1938	Prantik	The Borderland
Dance drama	1938	Chandalika	
Dance drama	1939	Shyama	
Poetry	1939	Prahasini	The Smiling One
Poetry	1939	Akash Pradip	
Poetry	1940	Nabajatak	The Newly Born
Poetry	1940	Sanai	The Pipe
Memoirs	1940	Chhelebela	My Boyhood Days
Paintings	1940	Chitralipi	
Short story	1940–1941	Laboratory	The Laboratory; Laboratory
Short story	1940–1941	Robibar (or Rabibar)	Sunday
Short story	1940–1941	Shesh Katha	The Epilogue; The Final Word
Poetry	1940–1941	Rogshajyay	From the Sick Bed
Poetry	1941	Arogyo	Recovery
Short story	1941	Badnaam (also Badnam or Bodnam)	Ill-repute
Short story	1941	Musulman Golpo (or Musolmanir Galpo or Mussalmanir Galpa)	The Story of a Mussalmani; The Story of a Muslim Woman
Short story	1941	Bado Khabar	Great News
Songs	1941	Gitabitan (revised; sorted by theme)	Garden of Songs
Essay	1941	Sabhyatar Sankat	Crisis in Civilization
Poetry	1941	Janmadine	Birthday
Poetry	1941	Shesh Lekha	Last Writings
Dance drama		Rituranga	
Dance drama		Prakritir Protoso	
Drama		Arup Ratan	
Drama		Chirakumar Sabha	
Drama		Sanyasi	The Ascetic
Drama			Autumn-Festival
Drama			King and Rebel
Lectures			Talks in China
Poetry		Mahuya	
Short story		Dhan ki Bhent	
Short story		Dristi (or Drishti)	Vision
Short story		Epher Baluarte	
Short story		Haldargoshthi	The Haldar Family
Short story		Idurer Bhoj	A Feast for Rats
Short story		Jajneshwarer Jajna	Jajneshwar's Offering
Short story		Jogesworer Jogyo	
Short story		Kadambini	
Short story		Mahamaya (or Sudha Mahamaya)	Mahamaya
Short story		Malyadan (or Malyadaan)	The Wedding Garland; The Garlanding; Exchange of Garlands
Short story		Manager Babu	
Short story		Master Ji	Master Ji or Master Zi
Short story		Megha o Raudra (or Megh O Roudra)	Cloud and Sunshine; Clouds and Sunshine
Short story		Muktir Upaay	Means of Freedom
Short story		Namanjur Galpo (or Namanjur Galpo)	An Unapproved Story; The Unapproved Story; The Rejected Story
Short story		Pragatisanghar	Throttling Progress
Short story		Pratihimsa (or Pratihinsa)	Retaliation; Revenge
Short story		Ramakanaier Nirbudhwita (or Ramkanaiyer Nirbuddhita)	Ramkanai's Folly
Short story		Tucch Bheet	
Short story		Yagneswarer Yagna	Yagneswar's Ceremony
Short story			Finally
Short story			Inheritance
Short story			The Middle One

== Collections of Short Stories ==
Type	Year	Bengali title	English translation(s)
Short Stories	1894	Chhoto Galpo	Collection of fifteen short stories
Short Stories	1894	Katha-Chatustaya	Collection of four short stories
Short Stories	1894	Vichitra Galpa (Parts I & II)	
Short Stories	1895	Galpa-Dasak	Collection of ten short stories
Short stories	1898 or 1899	Katha o Kahini	Lores and Legends
Short stories	1900	Galpoguchha (or Galpo-guchchha)	A Bouquet of Stories
Short stories	1901	Galpa	Stories (part II of Galpoguchha)
Short stories	1911	Aatti Galpa	Collection of eight short stories
Short stories	1912	Galpa Chaariti	Collection of four short stories
Short Stories	1913		Glimpses of Bengal. Includes 13 stories: The Fruit-Seller, The School Closes, A Resolve Accomplished, The Dumb Girl, The Wandering Guest, The Look Auspicious, A Study in Anatomy, The Landing Stairway, The Sentence, The Expiation, The Golden Mirage, The Trespass, The Hungry Stone.
Short Stories	1916		The Hungry Stones and other stories. Includes 13 stories: The Hungry Stones, The Victory, Once There Was a King, The Home-Coming, My Lord, The Baby, The Kingdom of Cards, The Devotee, Vision, The Babus of Nayanjore, Living or Dead?, "We Crown Thee King", The Renunciation, The Cabuliwallah)
Short Stories	1918		Mashi and Other Stories. Includes 14 stories: Mashi, The Skeleton, The Auspicious Vision, The Supreme Night, Raja and Rani, The Trust Property, The Riddle solved, The Elder Sister, Subha, The Postmaster, The River Stairs, The Castaway, Saved, My Fair Neighbour.
Short Stories	1918		Stories from Tagore. Includes 10 stories: The Cabuliwallah, The Home-Coming, Once there was a King, The Child's Return, Master Mashai, Subha, The Postmaster, The Castaway, The Son of Rashmani, The Babus of Nayanjore.
Short Stories	1925		Broken Ties and Other Stories. Includes the novel Broken Ties (Chaturanga) and 6 stories: In the Night, The Fugitive Gold, The Editor, Giribala, The Lost Jewels, Emancipation.
Children's stories	1937	Shay	He
Short stories	1940	Tin Sangi	Three Stories (Laboratory, Rabibar, Shesh Katha)
Children's stories	1941	Galpo Salpa	
Short stories	1944		The Parrot’s Training and Other Stories Includes 4 stories The Parrot’s Training, The Trial of the Horse, Old Man’s Ghost, Great News.
Short stories	1959		The Runaway and Other Stories. Translated by Somnath Maitra.
Short stories	1965		The Housewarming and Other Selected Writings. Translated by Mary Lago, Amiya Chakravarty and Tarun Gupta.
Short stories	1991		Selected Short Stories. Translated by William Radice; includes 30 stories from the 1890s: The Living and the Dead, The Postmaster, Profit and Loss, Housewife, Little Master's Return, The Divide, Taraprasanna's Fame, Wealth Surrendered, Skeleton, A Single Night, Fool's Gold, Holiday, Kabuliwallah, The Editor, Punishment, A Problem Solved, Exercise-Book, Forbidden Entry, In the Middle of the Night, Unwanted, Elder Sister, Fury Appeased, Thakurda, Guest, Wishes Granted, False Hope, Son-sacrifice, The Hungry Stones, Thoughtlessness, The Gift of Sight.
Short stories	1991		Selected Stories Translated by Krishna Dutta and Mary Lago; includes 14 stories: The Girl Between, The Broken Nest, The Atonement, The Punishment, The Notebook, The Postmaster, The Return of Khokababu, The Conclusion, The Nuisance, A Lapse of Judgment, Rashmoni’s Son, The Austere Wife, Bride and Bridegroom, The Rejected Story.
Short stories	2005		The Hidden Treasure & Other Stories Includes 8 stories: The Hidden Treasure, Cloud and Sun, Mahamaya, The Conclusion, The Parrot’s Training, The Trial of the Horse, Old Man’s Ghost and Great News.
Short stories	2005		Selected Short Stories. Various translators; ed. Sukanta Chaudhuri; includes 26 stories: The Ghat's Story, Ramkanai's Folly, The Exercise-Book, Inheritance, A Single Night, A Fanciful Story, The Living and the Dead, The Golden Deer, Kabuliwala, Subha, Punishment, Trespass, Grandfather, Hungry Stone, The Visitor, The Royal Mark, Folly, The Wedding Garland, The Haldar Family, The Wife's Letter, Woman Unknown, House Number One, The Unapproved Story, Balai, The Laboratory, The Story of a Mussalmani.
Short stories	2010		Selections from Galpaguchchha (3 volumes; translated by Ratan Kumar Chattopadhyay) Includes 61 stories: Volume 1: The Postmaster, Return of the Little Master, Chhuti, the Visitor, The Exercise Book, The Pedlar from Kabul, The Living and the Dead, The Golden Deer, A Bequest of Property, Trespass, Punishment, Means of Freedom, The Austere Woman, The Silent Girl, A Single Night, Jajneshwar's Offering, Taraprasanna's Achievement, A Tale of Fantasy, Forlorn Hope, Broken Nest.; Volume 2: Cloud and Sunshine, The Ghat's Story, The Matrimonial Deal, Ramkanai's Folly, Grandfather, Nuisance, The Matronly Boy, The Skeleton, Folly, Wish-fulfilment, The Rift, Reciprocation, Retaliation, Resentment Appeased, The Wedding Garland, The Intervening Woman, The Haldar Family, Rasmani's Son, Fertility Sacrifice, Nature's Child, Woman Bereft of Jewels, The Ending.; Volume 3: Hungry Stones, Hidden Treasure, The Editor, The Gift of Sight, Elder Sister, At Dead of Night, A Problem Solved, Atonement, The Inscrutable Woman, The Royal Mark, The Wife's Letter, An Unapproved Story, House Number One, In Quest of a Bride, The Laboratory, Throttling Progress, Sunday, The Story of a Muslim Woman, The Epilogue.

== Texts ==
=== Online texts in English ===
Stories

Novels

Poetry

Drama

Essays

Lectures

Letters

Memoirs

Translations

Travelogue

== See also ==
- Works of Rabindranath Tagore
- Adaptations of works of Rabindranath Tagore in film and television
- An Artist in Life — biography by Niharranjan Ray
- Stories by Rabindranath Tagore (2015 TV series)
- Political views of Rabindranath Tagore
