= Tanjina Toma =

Bangladeshi singer, music educator, and social advocate

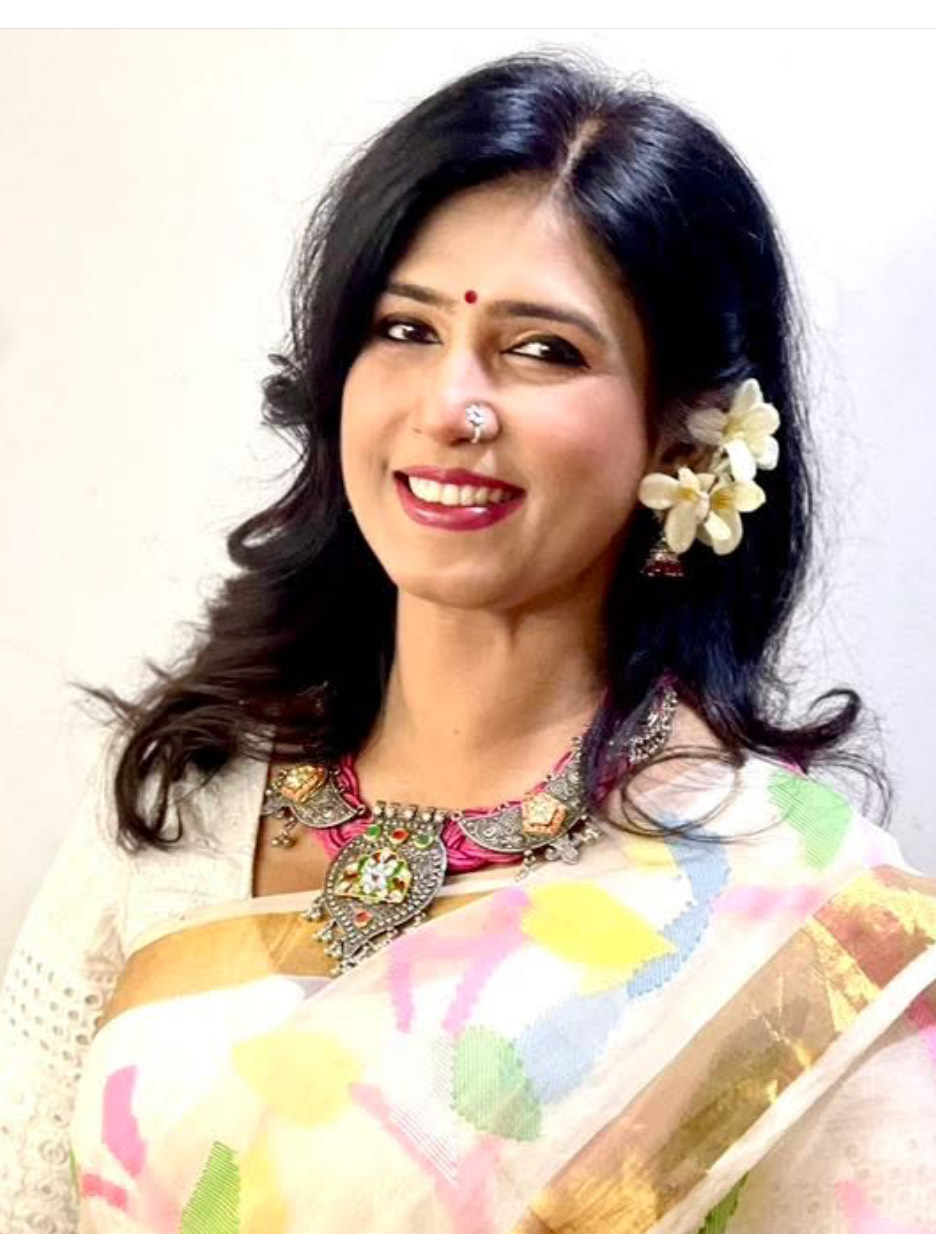

Background information
- Born: Dinajpur, Bangladesh
- Genres: Rabindra Sangeet (Tagore songs), Indian classical, Indian classical dance.
- Occupations: Singer, music educator of children with special needs, counsellor on music therapy
- Years active: 2001 – present
- Labels: G Series, HMV/SAREGAMA, Cozmic Harmony, Hindusthan Records

Tanjina Pervin (Bengali: তানজীনা তমা), better known as Tanjina Toma, is a Bangladeshi singer, music educator, and social advocate. She has released several musical albums and singles in Bangladesh and India since 2011. Toma is also the founder and principal of Bibhash Cultural Academy.

== Early life and education ==
Toma was born in Dinajpur, Bangladesh, and grew up in Dhaka. She began her musical and dance training under different institutions, exponents and teachers, and later studied at Chhayanaut, an institution in Bangladesh for different genres of music, where she graduated with distinction focusing on Tagore songs. She acquired the status of senior-grade artiste in the national Television and Radio, where she performs, and serves as a presenter on a regular basis in both state-owned and private media. Toma has been a regular commentator and presenter on several Television and Radio channels in both India and Bangladesh, promoting music education, counselling on music therapy for children with special needs and their families, parents, and caregivers.

She holds a bachelor’s and master’s degree in business management, and also received a five-year diploma in music.

== Career ==
=== Musical ===
Toma began her professional music career in the early 2000s. Her debut album Modhu Jamini was released in 2011. This was followed by Jibon Kotha in 2013 under the Cozmic Harmony label in Kolkata, India, and Khujey Berai in 2014 by G Series. In 2015, she released Tumi O Ami under the Indian music label HMV-SAREGAMA.

In 2023, Toma released two albums: Tomar Songey and Hriday Majhe, both under Hindusthan Records. The latter features selections from Gitabitan.

She has released over 100 singles since 2014, including Gahono Kusumo (2023), Megh Bolechhe Jabo Jabo (2023), Amra Emni Ese Bheshe Jai (2024), and O Je Mane Na Mana (2024).

Toma has given solo and joint performances at several venues. In December 2015, 2016, and in 2025, she performed at the Indira Gandhi Cultural Centre (IGCC) in Dhaka, sponsored by the Government of India. She has held a solo recital at the Bangladesh National Museum’s Begum Sufia Kamal Auditorium on several occasions since 2017. In 2015 and 2017, she was invited to perform at the ICCR Kolkata (Tagore Centre). On October 11, 2019, she shared the stage with Indian recitation artist Shovansundar Bosu in a joint concert at the Bangladesh National Museum (BNM), presided over by the Minister of Cultural Affairs of the Government of Bangladesh. She appeared again at the Bangladesh National Museum in 2025 for a collaborative performance.

Toma is affiliated with Rabindra Sangeet Shilpi Sangstha, the hub organization of all Tagore singers as the Senior Joint Secretary, and Rabindra Sangeet Sammilan Parishad, the music teaching and dissemination organization. She is an executive committee member of Music Club, Bangladesh, which does music collaborations with the national and international music fraternity. Her work is accessible on platforms including YouTube, Spotify, and SoundCloud.

She has performed in several countries across Europe, South Asia, and the Asia-Pacific region. In 2023, she participated in the International Mother Language Day celebration in The Hague, Netherlands, organized by the Bangladesh Embassy and Leiden University. In 2024, she performed in Paris, France, at a community event focused on Bengali culture. Between 2011 and 2024, she gave performances in Delhi, Kolkata, Tripura, and Bhubaneswar in India, with support from the Indian Council for Cultural Relations (ICCR), Tagore Society Jamshedpur, the Sri Aurobindo Institute, Bengal Web Solutions and different community organizations. In 2016, she visited Tripura for a performance at the invitation of then Chief Minister Manik Sarkar. From 2010 to 2025, she also took part in cultural exchange and bilateral goodwill tours in Germany, Sri Lanka, Nepal, the Philippines, and Thailand, supported by the government of Bangladesh and cultural agencies in the host countries.

=== Bibhash Cultural Academy and advocacy ===
In 2015, Toma founded Bibhash Cultural Academy, an educational initiative offering music and arts training, focusing on children from different ethnic communities and children with special needs. Since then, she has been serving as its principal, where she particularly focuses on teaching children with disabilities and disadvantaged backgrounds. The program incorporates therapeutic uses of music to support emotional well-being and social integration.

Toma is an advocate for inclusive arts education. Through community programs and workshops, she encourages the participation of children with disabilities in the arts. Her work promotes the idea of music as a bridge for social cohesion and healing.

She has been featured in discussions and interviews on music education, social cohesion, music for development, and pedagogical innovation in working with special-needs children in the media in Bangladesh and India.

== Awards and recognition ==
In 2016, Toma received the Performing Arts Award in Bangladesh for her work in music education for disadvantaged and disabled children. She was awarded the 71 Media Iconic Award in 2025 by 71 Media Vision and Channel I. In the same year, Toma was nominated for a Times of India Award for her contributions to Tagore music, social education, and serving children with special needs. In addition, she has also received several certificates of appreciation for her performances, teaching, and work with special-needs children.

== Selected discography ==
=== Albums ===
- Modhu Jamini (2011) – Debut album released in Bangladesh
- Jibon Kotha (2013) – Released by Cozmic Harmony, Kolkata
- Khujey Berai (2014) – Released by G Series, Bangladesh
- Tumi O Ami (2015) – Released by SAREGAMA, India
- Tomar Songey (2023) – Released by Hindusthan Records
- Hriday Majhe (2023) – Released by Hindusthan Records; selections from Gitabitan

=== Singles and EPs ===
- Katobar Bhebechhinu (2020)
- Kache Jobe Chilo (2021)
- Mamo Chitte Niti Nritye (2021)
- Ami Kemon Koria Janabo (2023)
- More Pathikere Bujhi Enecho (2023)
- Megh Bolechhe Jabo Jabo (2023)
- Gahono Kusumo (2023)
- Amar Mon Mane Na (2024)
- Ke Boleche Tomay Bodhu (2024)
- Tomarei Koriyachi Jiboner Dhrubotara (2024)
- Tomay Gaan Shonabo (2024)
- Je Mane Na Mana (2024)
- Amra Emni Ese Bheshe Jai (2024)
- Adhara Madhuri (2025)
- Je Kebol Paliye Beray (2025)
