= Rabindra Sangeet =

Songs composed by Rabindranath Tagore

- by Rabindranath Tagore
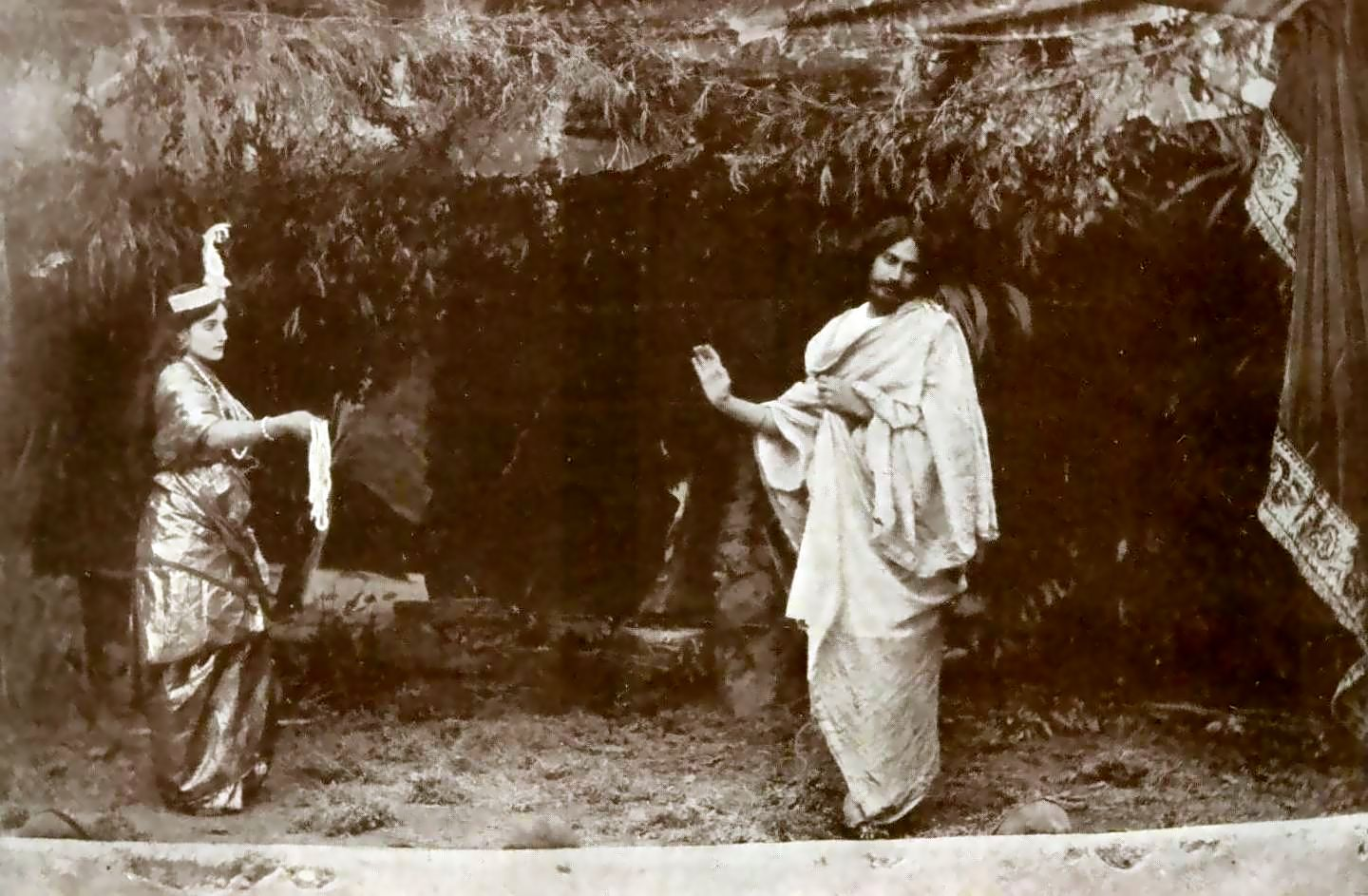
- Rabindranath Tagore (right) and Indira Devi Chaudhurani (left) in Valmiki-Pratibha opera
- Native name: রবীন্দ্রসঙ্গীত
- Composed: 1875–1941

Rabindra Sangeet (Bengali: রবীন্দ্র সঙ্গীত; pronounced [robindɾo ʃoŋɡit]), also known as Tagore Songs, are songs from the Indian subcontinent written and composed by the British Indian polymath Rabindranath Tagore, winner of the 1913 Nobel Prize in Literature, the first Indian and also the first non-European to receive such recognition. Tagore was a prolific composer, with approximately 2,232 songs to his credit. The songs have distinctive characteristics in the music of Bengal, created and popular in Bengal (modern Bangladesh and West Bengal, India) during British rule. One of his Rabindra Sangeet called, Bharoto Bhagyo Bidhata adopted as National anthem of India in 1911.

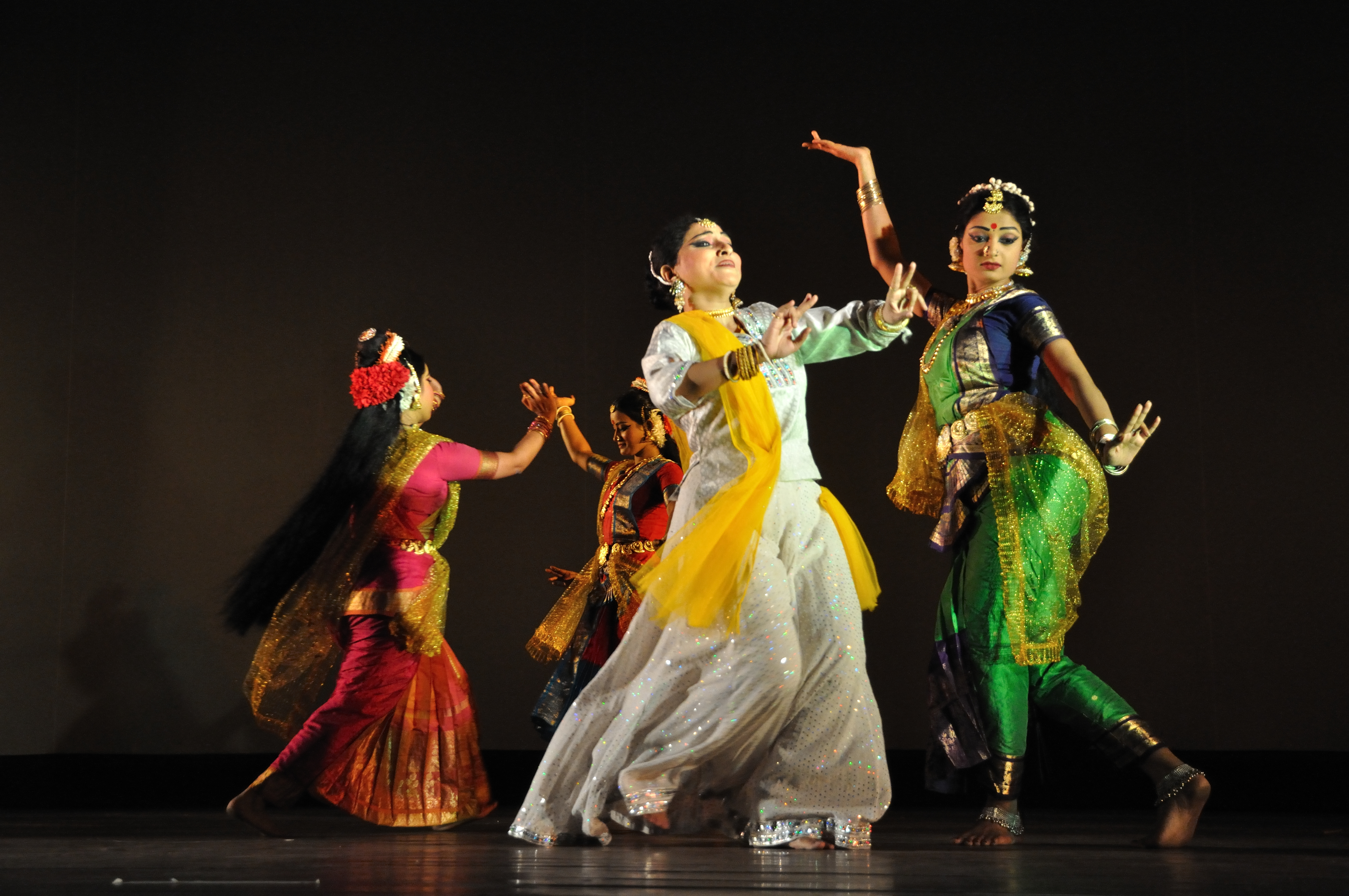
Dance accompanied by Rabindra Sangeet, at Science City auditorium in Kolkata.

It is characterised by its distinctive rendition while singing which, includes a significant amount of ornamentation like meend, murki, etc. and is filled with expressions of romanticism. The music combines elements of Hindustani classical music, Carnatic music, Western tunes and Bengali folk tradition. Lyrics and music both hold almost equal importance in Rabindra Sangeet. Tagore created some six new taals, inspired by Carnatic talas, because he felt the traditional taals existing at the time could not do justice and were coming in the way of the seamless narrative of the lyrics.

== History ==
The name Rabindra Sangeet was first introduced by the noted Indian author, economist and sociologist Dhurjati Prasad Mukherjee in the anthology Jayanti Utsarga, published on 27 December 1931, to commemorate Tagore's 70th birthday.

Rabindra Sangeet merges fluidly into Tagore's literature, most of which—poems or parts of novels, stories, or plays alike—were lyricised. Influenced by the thumri style of Hindustani music, they ran the entire gamut of human emotion, ranging from his early dirge-like Brahmo devotional hymns to quasi-erotic compositions. They emulated the tonal color of classical ragas to varying extents. Some songs mimicked a given raga's melody and rhythm faithfully; others newly blended elements of different ragas. Yet about nine-tenths of his work was not bhanga gaan, the body of tunes revamped with "fresh value" from select Western, Hindustani, Bengali folk and other regional flavours "external" to Tagore's own ancestral culture. In fact, Tagore drew influence from sources as diverse as traditional Hindusthani Thumri ("O Miya Bejanewale") to Scottish ballads ("Purano Shei Diner Kotha" from "Auld Lang Syne").

Scholars have attempted to gauge the emotive force and range of Hindustani ragas:

the pathos of the purabi raga reminded Tagore of the evening tears of a lonely widow, while kanara was the confused realization of a nocturnal wanderer who had lost his way. In bhupali he seemed to hear a voice in the wind saying 'stop and come hither'.Paraj conveyed to him the deep slumber that overtook one at night's end.

— Reba Som, Rabindranath Tagore: The Singer and His Song.

"Tabu Mone Rekho" – sung by Rabindranath Tagore
"Tabu Mone Rekho", a song by Tagore, sung in his own voice. The song was written in 1887 CE (1294 Bengali year).

Tagore influenced sitar maestro Vilayat Khan and sarodiyas Buddhadev Dasgupta and Amjad Ali Khan. His songs are widely popular and undergird the Bengali ethos to an extent perhaps rivalling Shakespeare's impact on the English-speaking world. It is said that his songs are the outcome of five centuries of Bengali literary churning and communal yearning. Dhan Gopal Mukerji has said that these songs transcend the mundane to the aesthetic and express all ranges and categories of human emotion. The poet gave voice to all—big or small, rich or poor. The poor Ganges boatman and the rich landlord air their emotions in them. They birthed a distinctive school of music whose practitioners can be fiercely traditional: novel interpretations have drawn severe censure in both West Bengal and Bangladesh.

For Bengalis, the songs' appeal, stemming from the combination of emotive strength and beauty described as surpassing even Tagore's poetry, was such that the Modern Review observed that "[t]here is in Bengal no cultured home where Rabindranath's songs are not sung or at least attempted to be sung ... Even illiterate villagers sing his songs". A. H. Fox Strangways of The Observer introduced non-Bengalis to rabindrasangit in The Music of Hindostan, calling it a "vehicle of a personality ... [that] go behind this or that system of music to that beauty of sound which all systems put out their hands to seize."

In 1971, Amar Shonar Bangla became the national anthem of Bangladesh. It was written—ironically—to protest the 1905 Partition of Bengal along communal lines: lopping Muslim-majority East Bengal from Hindu-dominated West Bengal was to avert a regional bloodbath. Tagore saw the partition as a ploy to upend the independence movement, and he aimed to rekindle Bengali unity and tar communalism. Jana Gana Mana was written in shadhu-bhasha, a Sanskritised register of Bengali, and is the first of five stanzas of a Brahmo hymn that Tagore composed. It was first sung in 1911 at a Calcutta session of the Indian National Congress, and was adopted in 1950 by the Constituent Assembly of the Republic of India as its national anthem.

== Songs ==
It is believed on 27 December 1931, Dhurjatiprasad Mukhopadhyay wrote an essay titled "রবীন্দ্রনাথের সংগীত" (Rabindranath's Music) for Tagore's 70th birth anniversary, in which the term "Rabindrasangeet" was used for the first time. In January 1935, Kanak Das's recording P11792, featuring "মনে রবে কিনা রবে আমারে" ("Whether or not I remain in your recollection") and "কাছে যবে ছিল পাশে হল না যাওয়া" ("When you were near, I couldn't reach you") first used "Rabindrasangeet" on the label. Tagore's compositions cover topics including humanism, structuralism, introspection, psychology, romance, yearning, nostalgia, reflection, and modernism, offering melody for every season and every aspect of Bengali life. Tagore primarily worked with two subjects – first, the human being, the being and the becoming of that human being, and second, Nature, in all her myriad forms and colours, and of the relationship between the human being and Nature and how Nature affects the behavior and the expressions of human beings. Bhanusimha Thakurer Padavali (or Bhanusingher Podaboli), one of Tagore's earliest works in music, was primarily in a language that is similar and yet different from Bengali – this language, Brajabuli, was derived from the language of the Vaishnav hymns, and of texts like Jayadeva's Gita Govinda, some influences from Sanskrit can be found, courtesy Tagore's extensive homeschooling in the Puranas, the Upanishads, as well as in poetic texts like Kalidasa's Meghadūta and Abhigyanam Shakuntalam. Tagore was one of the greatest narrators of all time, and throughout his life, we find a current of narration through all his works that surges with upheavals in the psyche of the people around him, as well as with the changes of seasons. A master of metaphor, it is often difficult to identify the true meaning that underlies his texts, but what is truly great about Tagore, is that his songs are identifiable with any and every possible mood, with every possible situation that is encountered by a person in the course of life. This truly reinforces the notion that Rabindrasangeet has at its heart some unbelievably powerful poetry. The Upanishads influenced his writing throughout his life, and his devotional music is addressed almost always to an inanimate entity, a personal, a private god, whom modernists call the Other.

Rabindranath Tagore was a curator of melodic and compositional styles. In the course of his travels all over the world, he came into contact with the musical narratives of the West, of the South of India, and these styles are reflected in some of his songs. There are several classifications of his work. The ones that beginners most often use are those based on genre – devotional (Puja Porjaay), romantic (Prem Porjaay) [Note: It often becomes difficult, if not impossible, on hearing a song, to determine if it falls in the devotional genre or the romantic. The line between the two is blurred, by certain creations of Tagore himself, e.g. Tomarei Koriyachi Jibonero Dhrubotara. Also, Tagore never made these divisions. Only after his death was the need felt to categorize, compile and thus preserve his work, and the genre-classification system was born out of this need.] seasonal (Prokriti Porjaay) – summer (Grishho), monsoon (Borsha), autumn (Shorot), early winter (Hemonto), winter (Sheet), Spring (Boshonto); diverse (Bichitro), patriotic (Deshatmobodhok). Although Deshatmobodh and patriotism are completely antipodal concepts, yet the difficulties of translation present themselves, apart from songs specified for certain events or occasions (Aanushtthanik) and the songs he composed for his numerous plays and dance-dramas.

== Collections ==
The book forming a collection of all 2,233 songs written by Rabindranath is called Gitabitan ("Garden of songs") and forms an important part of extant historical materials pertaining to Bengali musical expression. The six major parts of this book are Puja (worship), Prem (love), Prakriti (seasons), Swadesh (patriotism), Aanushthanik (occasion-specific), Bichitro (miscellaneous) and Nrityonatya (dance dramas and lyrical plays).

The Swarabitan, published in 64 volumes, includes the texts of 1,721 songs and their musical notation. The volumes were first published between 1936 and 1955.

Earlier collections, all arranged chronologically, include Rabi Chhaya (1885), Ganer Bahi or Valmiki Pratibha (1893), Gan (1908), and Dharmashongit (1909).

== Exponents ==
Since the establishment of the Sangeet Bhavan of Tagore's own Visva-Bharati University at Shantiniketan, along with its codification of Rabindra Sangeet instruction, multiple generations have created Rabindra Sangeet (its aesthetics and singing style) into a tangible cultural tradition breeding many singers who now specialize in singing Tagore's works. Some notable early exponents of Rabindra Sangeet who laid down its foundations and continue to inspire generations of singers include: Kanika Banerjee. Suchitra Mitra, Pankaj Mullick, Hemant Kumar, Debabrata Biswas, Kishore Kumar, Manna Dey, Shyamal Mitra, Santidev Ghosh, Sagar Sen, Subinoy Roy, Chinmoy Chattopadhyay Ashoketaru Bandyopadhay and Sumitra Sen.

== Historical influence ==
Rabindra Sangeet has been an integral part of Bengal culture for over a century. Hindu monk and Indian social reformer Swami Vivekananda became an admirer of Rabindra Sangeet in his youth. He composed music in the Rabindra Sangeet style, for example Gaganer Thale in Raga Jaijaivanti.

=== Digitization ===
As of July 2016, 7,864 Rabindra Sangeet have been digitized by Saregama and are available online for download.

Furthermore, popular Rabindrasangeet has been digitized and featured on featured Phalguni Mookhopadhayay's YouTube channel as part of Brainware University's initiative. Launched on 9 May 2023, this project aims to promote Rabindranath Tagore's cultural heritage. The initiative includes 100 selected songs, translated and sung by Mookhopadhayay, which are being gradually released along with detailed anecdotes, appreciations, blogs, critical essays, and research papers, making Tagore's works accessible to Bengali and non-Bengali households worldwide.

== See also ==
- Music of Bengal
- Works of Rabindranath Tagore
