= Rogshajyay =

- Author: Rabindranath Tagore
- Language: Bengali
- Genre: Poetry
- Published: 1940
- Publication place: India

Rogshajyay, also spelt as "Rogashojyay" or "Rogashajyaya", (Bengali: রোগশয্যায়; English: "From the sickbed") is a Bengali language poetry book written by Rabindranath Tagore. It was published in 1940. It is a significant work at the "Last Phase" of Rabindranath's poetry.
