= Gitabitan =

Collection of songs by Rabindranath Tagore

Gitabitan (lit. 'Garden of songs') is a book forming a collection of all 2,232 songs (Rabindra Sangeet) written by Bengali polymath Rabindranath Tagore.

== Editions ==
The first edition of three volumes was published in 1931 and 1932, and contained the songs in chronological order. To make the collection more user-friendly, Tagore revised the book and arranged the songs by theme. The revised edition of the first two volumes was published in 1941, the year when Tagore died. Volume three, which included all of Tagore's dance-dramas, was published in 1950. In 1960 Visva Bharati published the Gitabitan as a single volume.

== Themes ==
The six major parts of this book are Puja (worship), Prem (love), Prakriti (seasons), Swadesh (patriotism), Aanushthanik (occasion-specific), Bichitro (miscellaneous) and Nrityonatya (dance dramas and lyrical plays).

== Other collections ==
The Swarabitan, published in 64 volumes, includes the texts of 1,721 songs and their musical notation. The volumes were first published between 1936 and 1955.

Earlier collections, all arranged chronologically, include Rabi Chhaya (1885), Ganer Bahi o Valmiki Pratibha (1893), Gan (1908), and Dharmashongit (1909).
