= Kabuliwala (short story) =

Short story of India by Rabindranath Tagore

- Short story by Rabindranath Tagore

Text available at Wikisource
- Country: India
- Language: Bengali

Publication
- Published in: Sadhana
- Publication date: 1892

"Kabuliwala" is a Bengali short story written by Rabindranath Tagore in 1892. The story was written during Tagore's "Sadhana" period (named for one of Tagore's magazines) from 1891 to 1895. The story is about a fruit seller, a Pashtun named Rahmat from Kabul, Afghanistan, who visits Calcutta (present day Kolkata, India) each year to sell dry fruits. While living in India, he develops a filial affection for a five-year-old girl, Mini, from a middle-class aristocratic family, who reminds him of his own daughter back home in Afghanistan.

== Theme and plot ==
The main theme of this story is that humans, no matter what their nationality, are all the same, as symbolised by filial affection—the deep love that fathers have for their children. In the story there are three examples of filial affection—the narrator and his daughter Mini; the Kabuliwala "Rahmat" and his own daughter in Afghanistan; and the Rahmat "Kabuliwala" and Mini. In this story Rahmat comes to India every year to sell dry-fruits and to meet a girl named Mini. He had a physical altercation with a person while collecting debts and was imprisoned. Eight years later, he was released from jail. He returned to meet Mini at her house on her wedding day, but she had grown up and did not recognise him. Her father, however, gave him some money so that he could visit his own daughter.

== Adaptations ==
The story has adapted a number of times as listed below:

- Kabuliwala, a 1957 Bengali movie
- Kabuliwala, a 1961 Hindi movie
- Kabuliwala, a 2006 Bengali movie
- Kabuliwala, a 2015 episode in the television series Stories by Rabindranath Tagore
- Bioscopewala, a 2018 Hindi movie
- Kabuliwala, a 2023 Bengali movie
- Balloon Dog, a 2025 play written by Jacob Rajan and Justin Lewis

== See also ==
- List of works by Rabindranath Tagore
