= Utsarga =

Bengali poetry book

- Author: Rabindranath Tagore
- Language: Bengali
- Genre: Poetry
- Published: 1914
- Publication place: India

Utsarga (Bengali: উৎসর্গ; English: Dedication) is a Bengali language poetry book by Rabindranath Tagore. It was published in 1914. It is a notable creation in the "Intermediate Period" of Tagore's poetry. He had included 1 poem of "Utsarga" in the Nobel Prize winning work Song Offerings.
