= Prantik (poetry collection) =

Poetry book by Rabindranath Tagore

Prantik (Bengali: প্রান্তিক; English: The Borderland) is a Bengali poetry book written by Rabindranath Tagore. It was published in 1938. It consists of 18 poems. It is a significant work in the final phase of Rabindranath's poetry.

== List of poems ==
The 18 poems of "Prantik" are:

1. Bishwaer aloklupta timirer antaraley elo
2. Ore chirabikhhu, tor ajanmakaler bhikhhajhuli
3. E janmer sathe lagna swapner jatil sutra jabe
4. Satya mor abalipta sangsarer bichitra pralepe
5. Paschater nityasahachar, akritartha hey atit
6. Mukti ai–sahaje phiriya asa sahajer majhe
7. E ki akritagatar bairagya pralap khhane khhane
8. Rangamanche eke eke nibe gelo jabe dipshikha
9. Dekhilam abasanna chetanar godhulibelay
10. Mrityudoot esechilo hey pralayankar, akasmat
11. Kalarabmukharita khyatir prangane je asan
12. Sheser abagahan sanga karo, kobi,
13. Ekada parammulya janmakhhan diyeche tomay
14. Jabar samoy holo bihanger
15. Abarudha chilo bayu; daitya sama punjo meghabhar
16. Pathik dekhechi ami purane kirtita kato desh
17. Jedin chaitanya mor mukti pelo luptiguha hate
18. Naginira chari dike pheliteche bishakta nishwas
