= Shes Saptak =

Shes Saptak (Bengali: শেষ সপ্তক; English: The Last Octave) is a Bengali poetry book written by Rabindranath Tagore. It was published in 1935. Tagore wrote the poems of the book in the style, prose poems, like "Punascha", "Patraput" and "Shyamali", etc.

== List of poems ==
The poems of Shes Saptak are:

1. Sthir jenechilam, peyechi tomake
2. Ekdin tuchha alaper phank diye
3. Phuriye gelo pouser din
4. Joubaner prantasimay
5. Barsha nemeche prantare animantrane
6. Diner prante ashechi
7. Anek hajar bacharer
8. Mone mone dekhlum
9. Bhalobese mon balle
10. Mone hoyechila aj sab-kata durgraha
11. Bhorer alo-adhanre
12. Keu chena noy
13. Rastay cholte cholte
14. Kalo andhakarer talay
15. Ami badal karechi amar basa
16. Parechi aaj rekhar mayay
17. Amar kache shunte cheyecha
18. Amra ki sattie chai shoker abasan
19. Takhan bayos chilo kancha
20. Sedin amader chilo khola sabha
21. Nutan kalpe
22. Shuru hatei o amar sanga dhareche
23. Aaj sharater aloy ai je cheye dekhi
24. Amar phulbaganer phulgulike
25. Panchiler edhare
26. Akashe cheye dekhi
27. Amar ai choto kalsita pete rakhi
28. Tumi prabhater shukatara
29. Anekkaler ektimatra din
30. dekha halo
31. Paray ache club
32. Pilsujer upar pitaler pradip
33. Badshaher hukum
34. Pathik ami
35. Anger bandhane bandhapara amar pran
36. Shiter ruddor
37. Biswalakshmi
38. He jakhha, sedin prem tomader
39. Ora ase amake bole
40. Hrisi kobi balechen
41. Halka amar swabhab
42. Tumi golpa jamate para
43. Panchiche boishakh chaleche
44. Amar shes belakar ghorkhani
45. Takhan amar ayur tarani
46. Takhan amar bayos chilo saat
47. Sanjojan (Smriti-patheya)
