= Prakritir Pratisodh =

Bengali-language play by Tagore

Prakritir Pratisodh (প্রকৃতির প্রতিশোধ, literally The Ascetic, translated as Nature's Revenge) is a Bengali drama by Rabindranath Tagore written in 1884. In his memoirs, Tagore described the play's themes as "an introduction to the whole of my future literary work; or, rather this has been the subject on which all my writings have dwelt—the joy of attaining the Infinite within the finite." Though an early work, Tagore considered it mature enough to be included in the first volume of his collected poetry.

== Plot ==
An ascetic renounces nature, viewing it as a barrier to wisdom, but gives aid to an orphaned girl whose death reminds him that wisdom is not achieved through renunciation, but by recognising the cyclical natural processes in which humans are situated.

== Critical response ==
Amrit Sen reads the play as a representation of humanity's intrinsic attachment to natural phenomena, and an illustration of Tagore's thesis "that human salvation does not lie in an ascetic segregation from Nature; it lies in acknowledging humanity as part of Nature and sharing its creative joy." Arnab Bhattacharya comments on the metaphorical significance of the cave in which the ascetic lives, identifying it as a reconfiguration of Plato's allegory of the cave and noting that it suggests both the fulness of the soul and its ignorance.
