= Punascha (poetry) =

Punascha (Bengali: পুনশ্চ; English: Postscript) is a book of Bengali poems written by Rabindranath Tagore. It was published in 1932. Tagore wrote the book in the new style, prose poems. It deals with the human problems regarding life and death. Tagore dedicated this work to Nitu. There are 50 poems in the book.

== List of poems ==
The poems of "Punascha" are:

1. Natok
2. Patra
3. Phank
4. Sundar
5. Bichhed
6. Sahajatri
7. Balak
8. Camelia
9. Ekjon lok
10. Khyeti
11. Bhiru
12. Shuchi
13. Premer sona
14. Asthane
15. Mrityo
16. Shapmochan
17. Poila ashwin
18. Nutan kaal
19. Pukur-dhare
20. Basa
21. Shesh dan
22. Smriti
23. Biswashok
24. Chera kagojer jhuri
25. Shalikh
26. Khelnar mukti
27. Banshi
28. Tirthajatri
29. Rangrejini
30. Snansamapan
31. Ghorchara
32. Manabputra
33. Chuti
34. Kopai
35. Khowai
36. Aparadhi
37. Dekha
38. Komalgandhar
39. Cheleta
40. Shesh chiti
41. Kiter sangsar
42. Sadharan meye
43. Patralekha
44. Unnati
45. Chiraruper bani
46. Mukti
47. Prothom puja
48. Chutir ayojon
49. Sishutirtha
50. Gaaner basa
