= Palataka (book) =

1918 book by Rabindranath Tagore

Palataka (Bengali: পলাতকা; English: "The Runaway" or "The Fugitive") is a Bengali poetry book written by Rabindranath Tagore. It was published in 1918. It consists of 15 poems.

== Background ==
There were mainly two points behind the writing of the book "Palataka". These are: (a) the political tensions and (b) the serious social conditions of the Indian women. The book shows Tagore's rebellious nature and reflects his sensitivity to social life.

== List of poems ==
The poems of "Palataka" are:

1. Palataka
2. Phanki
3. Mala
4. Kalo meye
5. Hariye-jaoya
6. Chiradiner daga
7. Mayer samman
8. Bhola
9. Asol
10. Shesh gaan
11. Mukti
12. Nishkriti
13. Chinnyo patra
14. Thakurdadar chuti
15. Shesh pratistha
