= Political views of Rabindranath Tagore =

Bengali author and statesman Rabindranath Tagore was a poet, philosopher, educationist and cultural reformer. He lived during the long period of Indian independence and was acquainted with several political leaders in Asia.

== Politics ==
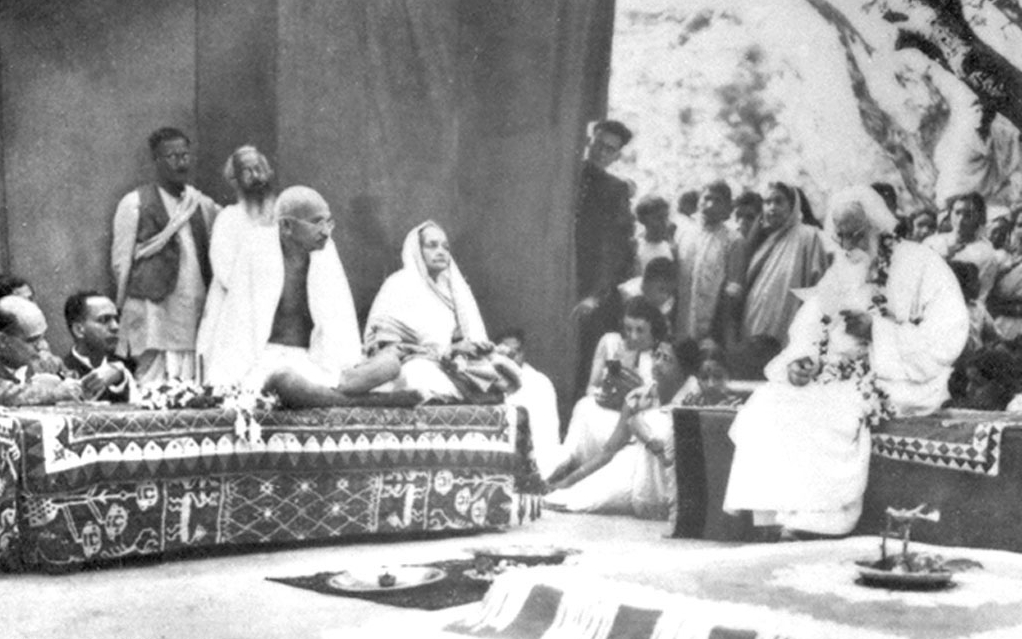
Tagore (at right, on the dais) hosts Mahatma Gandhi and wife Kasturba at Santiniketan in 1940.

Tagore's politics exhibited a marked ambivalence—on the one hand, he denounced European imperialism, occasionally voicing full support for Indian nationalists; on the other hand, he also shunned the Swadeshi movement, denouncing it in his acrid September 1925 essay The Cult of the Charkha (an allusion to elements of Gandhism and the Non-Cooperation Movement). For example, in reaction to a 22 July 1904 suggestion by the British that Bengal should be partitioned, an upset Tagore took to delivering a lecture—entitled "Swadeshi Samaj" ("The Union of Our Homeland")—that instead proposed an alternative solution: a self-help based comprehensive reorganization of rural Bengal. In addition, he viewed British control of India as a "political symptom of our social disease", urging Indians to accept that "there can be no question of blind revolution, but of steady and purposeful education".

In line with this, Tagore denounced nationalism, deeming it among humanity's greatest problems. "A nation," he wrote, "... is that aspect which a whole population assumes when organized for a mechanical purpose", a purpose often associated with a "selfishness" that "can be a grandly magnified form" of personal selfishness. During his extensive travels, he formed a vision of East-West unity. Subsequently, he was shocked by the rising nationalism found in Germany and other nations prior to the World War II. Tagore thus delivered a series of lectures on nationalism; although well-received throughout much of Europe, they were mostly ignored or criticized in Japan and the United States.

Yet Tagore wrote songs lionizing the Indian independence movement. On 30 May 1919, he renounced the knighthood that had been conferred upon him by Lord Hardinge in 1915 in protest against the Amritsar massacre (Jallianwallah Bagh), when British soldiers killed at least 379 unarmed civilians. He was also instrumental in resolving a dispute between Gandhi and Bhimrao Ramji Ambedkar; it involved Ambedkar's insistence on separate electorates for untouchables and Gandhi's announcement—in protest against the concession—of a fast "unto death" beginning on 20 September 1932.

Nonetheless, Tagore wasn't averse to displaying his perception of social status, as evidenced in the course of a meeting that took place in 1920 with Danish critic Georg Brandes and the latter's secretary.

Tagore also lashed out against the orthodox rote-oriented educational system introduced in India under the Raj.^{[λ]} He lampooned it in his short story "The Parrot's Training", where a bird—which ultimately dies—is caged by tutors and force-fed pages torn from books. These views crystallised in his experimental school at Santiniketan, (শান্তিনিকেতন, "Abode of Peace"), founded in 1901 on the site of a West Bengal estate inherited from his father. Established in the traditional gurukul structure—whereby students live under a guru in a self-sustaining community—became a magnet for talented scholars, artists, linguists, and musicians from diverse backgrounds. Tagore spent prodigious amounts of energy fundraising for Santiniketan, even contributing all his Nobel Prize money. Today, Tagore's school is a Central University under the Government of India.

== See also ==
- Pan-Asianism

== Notes ==
λ. Indeed, Tagore stated that "I suppose it was fortunate for me that I never in my life had what is called an education, that is to say, the kind of school and college training which is considered proper for a boy from a respectable family".
