= Nastanirh =

1901 Bengali novella by Rabindranath Tagore

Nastanirh (The Broken Nest)
- Title page for The Broken Nest (1971 edition)
- Author: Rabindranath Tagore
- Original title: Nastanirh
- Language: Bengali
- Genre: Novella
- Publication date: 1901
- Publication place: British India

Nastanirh (also Nashtanir; Bengali: নষ্টনীড়, Nôshţoniŗh; English: 'The Broken Nest') is a 1901 Bengali novella by Rabindranath Tagore. It is the basis for the noted 1964 film Charulata, by Satyajit Ray.

== Background ==
According to Mary Lago in the introduction to the English translation of Nashtanir (translated by Lago and Supriya Sen), the novella was released three times: in 1901 in serial format, in 1909 as part of a special short story collection, and in 1926 as part of Tagore's standard collection of fiction (p. 9).

Scholarship indicates that this story might have been based upon the relationship between Tagore's elder brother Jyotirindranath; his brother's wife, Kadambari Devi (who died by suicide shortly after Tagore's marriage); and Tagore (who spent a great deal of time with Kadambari, reading and writing poetry).

== Plot summary ==
Nastanirh takes place in late 19th-century Bengal and explores the lives of the "Bhadralok", Bengalis of wealth who were part of the Bengal Renaissance and highly influenced by the Brahmo Samaj. Despite his liberal ideas, Bhupati is blind to the loneliness and dissatisfaction of his wife, Charu. It is only with the appearance of his cousin, Amal, who incites passionate feelings in Charu, that Bhupati realizes what he has lost.

== Film adaptations ==
Charulata (transl. The Lonely Wife) is a 1964 film by Bengali director Satyajit Ray, featuring Soumitra Chatterjee, Madhabi Mukherjee, and Sailen Mukherjee, and is based upon Nastanirh.

Another adaptation is Charuulata 2011 by director Agnidev Chatterjee.

== Translations ==
- Tagore, Rabindranath. Broken Nest (Nashtanir). Translated into English by Mary M. Lago and Supriya Sen. New Delhi: Macmillan India Ltd, 2000.
- Tagore, Rabindranath. Chârulatâ. Translated into French by France Bhattacharya. Paris: Zulma, 2009.
- Tagore, Rabindranath. ചാരുലത (Charulatha). Translated into Malayalam by Leela Sarkar. Thrissur Kerala: Green Books, 2010.Charulatha MalayalamAmazon

== See also ==
- Ghare Baire
- Works of Rabindranath Tagore
- Parineeta - contemporary novel
