= Bhikharini =

Short story by Rabindranath Tagore

- Short story by Rabindranath Tagore
- Original title: ভিখারিণী
- Country: India
- Language: Bengali

Publication

"Bhikharini" (English: The Beggar Woman) is a Bengali short story written by Rabindranath Tagore. The story was first published in 1877 in Bharati and was the first short story written in Bengali language. This was also Tagore's own first short story, and he was 16 years old at the time of its publication.

== Plot ==
The story is set in a village in Kashmir. Amar Singh and Kamal Devi are the main protagonists of the story. They grew up together and were good friends. Kamal's father was a renowned person in the village and Amar's father Ajit Singh was a commander (Senapati) in the king's army. Their families arranged Amar and Kamal's marriage. After the death of Kamal's father, their family's financial condition became poor.
