= Raktakarabi (play) =

Play by Rabindranath Tagore

Raktakarabi (Bengali: রক্তকরবী, lit. 'Red Oleanders') is a symbolic play by Rabindranath Tagore. It was written at Shillong in 1923/1924 (1330 BS), and was originally titled Yaksapuri. It was published in the Ashwin 1331 (September/October 1924) edition of Prabasi.

The play is set in a world where a greedy king forces his subjects to mine for gold. One of the main characters is Nandini, a woman whose sole ornament is jewels made from red oleanders, which she wears as a tribute to Ranjan, the man she loves.

In a 2016 review of a production of Raktakarabi at the Academy of Fine Arts, Kolkata, the play is called 'Tagore's finest protest against totalitarianism'. According to writer Pratap Narayan Biswas, the story of Raktakarabi is inspired by a play by August Strindberg and the character of Raktakarabi, Nandini, is similar to the character of that play. According to literary critics, Tagore expressed his socialist spirit through this play. However, according to Mazharul Haque Lipu of Bangla Tribune, it is different from the socialist concept of Karl Marx.

The play has been staged multiple times in India and Bangladesh as well as adapted into films and TV dramas. Shaukat Hossain Sajib, Director from Prachyanat School of Acting and Design, said about the play "...while doing the play Raktakarbi, I never felt that it was written 100 years ago, rather it felt more modern than our current thinking. Therefore, we feel that Yakshapuri is 50 years from now". Writer Syed Mujtaba Ali commented that the play was "good but complex" after hearing it from Tagore's mouth. According to Professor Fazlul Haque Saikat of Bengali Department from National University, it is a theoretical play that highlights the conflict between agricultural and mechanized civilization. According to Sanjay Sarkar of Sampratik Deshkal, the play shows how the greed of money and wealth is destroying nature, so Tagore's thought about environment is also revealed here.
