= The Cult of the Charkha =

1925 essay by Rabindranath Tagore

The Cult of the Charkha is an essay by Rabindranath Tagore which first appeared in September 1925 in the Modern Review. In the essay Tagore offered critique on the Gandhian ethic of "charkha-spinning" as an activity which could rejuvenate the Indian masses during the Indian independence movement.

== Context ==
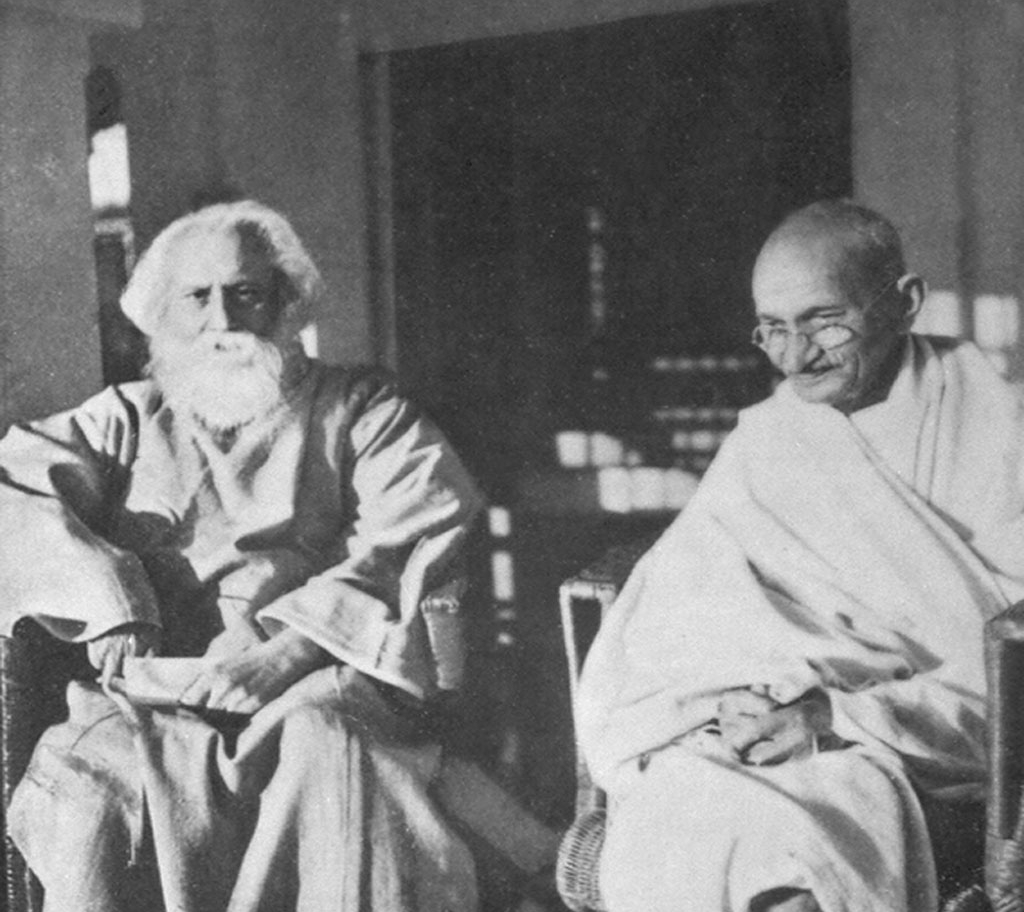
Gandhi and Tagore in 1940

Rabindranath Tagore and Mohandas Karamchand Gandhi were among the two most influential Indian figures during the independence movement against the colonial rule of the British. Tagore became the first non-European to be awarded the Nobel Prize for Literature in 1913 and was instrumental in reshaping Bengali literature and music. He was considered widely as a colossus of the Indian intelligentsia. Gandhi, on the other hand, emerged as the pre-eminent political and ideological leader of India during the Indian independence movement. He was a mobilizer of the masses and respected and venerated across India as the ‘Mahatma’ (or Great Soul). Incidentally, Tagore is said to have accorded and popularized this title for Gandhi. The two men had great mutual respect for each other but often differed significantly on some issues.

One such issue was Gandhi's call for spinning the charkha as an activity which was to be the locus of the Swadeshi and Non-cooperation movement. Tagore did not view this as a beneficial exercise and wrote the essay as a critique against it.

In the Indian context, this text is of immense value as it offers a dialogue on the role of machinery, nature of labor and its role in rejuvenating the intellectual life of the nation.

== The problem of repetition ==
Tagore begins by stating that in the Indian society through the processes of the caste system there has been a "leveling down" of the masses over the ages.

Every individual of every caste has his function assigned to him, together with the obsession into which he has been hypnotized, that, since he is bound by some divine mandate, accepted by his first ancestor, it would be sinful for him to seek relief therefrom. This imitation of the social scheme of ant-life makes very easy the performance of petty routine duties, but specially difficult the attainment of manhood’s estate. It imparts skill to the limbs of the man who is a bondsman, whose labor is drudgery; but it kills the mind of a man who is a doer, whose work is creation. So in India, during long ages past, we have the spectacle of only a repetition of that which has gone before.

-Rabindranath Tagore, "The Cult of the Charkha"

He claims this problem of repetition cuts at the very soul of human spirit and is contrary to the work of God evidenced by the infusion of the human ‘mind’ which is independent and free. The only way that masters in the past have been able to subjugate masses into slavery is by poisoning the mind either by fear or greed or ‘hypnotic texts’. Tagore believes that the Gandhian ethic of charkha-spinning is simply another device for lulling the human mind into a sort of conformity against the colonial government, and is not the base for any real intellectual or spiritual rejuvenation as claimed by Gandhi.

Human nature has its elasticity; and in the name of urgency, it can be forced towards a particular direction far beyond its normal and wholesome limits. But the rebound is sure to follow, and the consequent disillusionment will leave behind it a desert track of demoralization... ... I am afraid of a blind faith on a very large scale in the charkha, in the country, which is so liable to succumb to the lure of short cuts when pointed out by a personality about whose moral earnestness they can have no doubt. -Rabindranath Tagore, "The Cult of the Charkha"

== The nature of labor ==
Tagore considers another argument which has often followed the cult of the charkha, which is the effect of external labor on the mind. Tagore is critical of the impact of manual labor in rejuvenating the mind of the person undertaking it. He brings into question the nature of labor indulged in. Repetitive manual labor routine without innovation and fresh inputs is unlikely to positively impact the intellect. Tagore illustrates this point with the following example:

By doing the same thing day after day mechanical skill may be acquired; but the mind like a mill-turning bullock will be kept going round and round a narrow range of habit. That Is why, in every country man has looked down on work which involves this kind of mechanical repetition. -Rabindranath Tagore, "The Cult of the Charka"

He further counters any points on the dignity of manual labor, by stating that the survival instinct of man might allow him suppress his intellectual needs, but claiming that there is a comfort in the dignity of the same would be taking it too far. Thus, Tagore negates the positive impact that the hours manual labor while spinning the charkha can have on a person.

== The charkha as a symbol ==
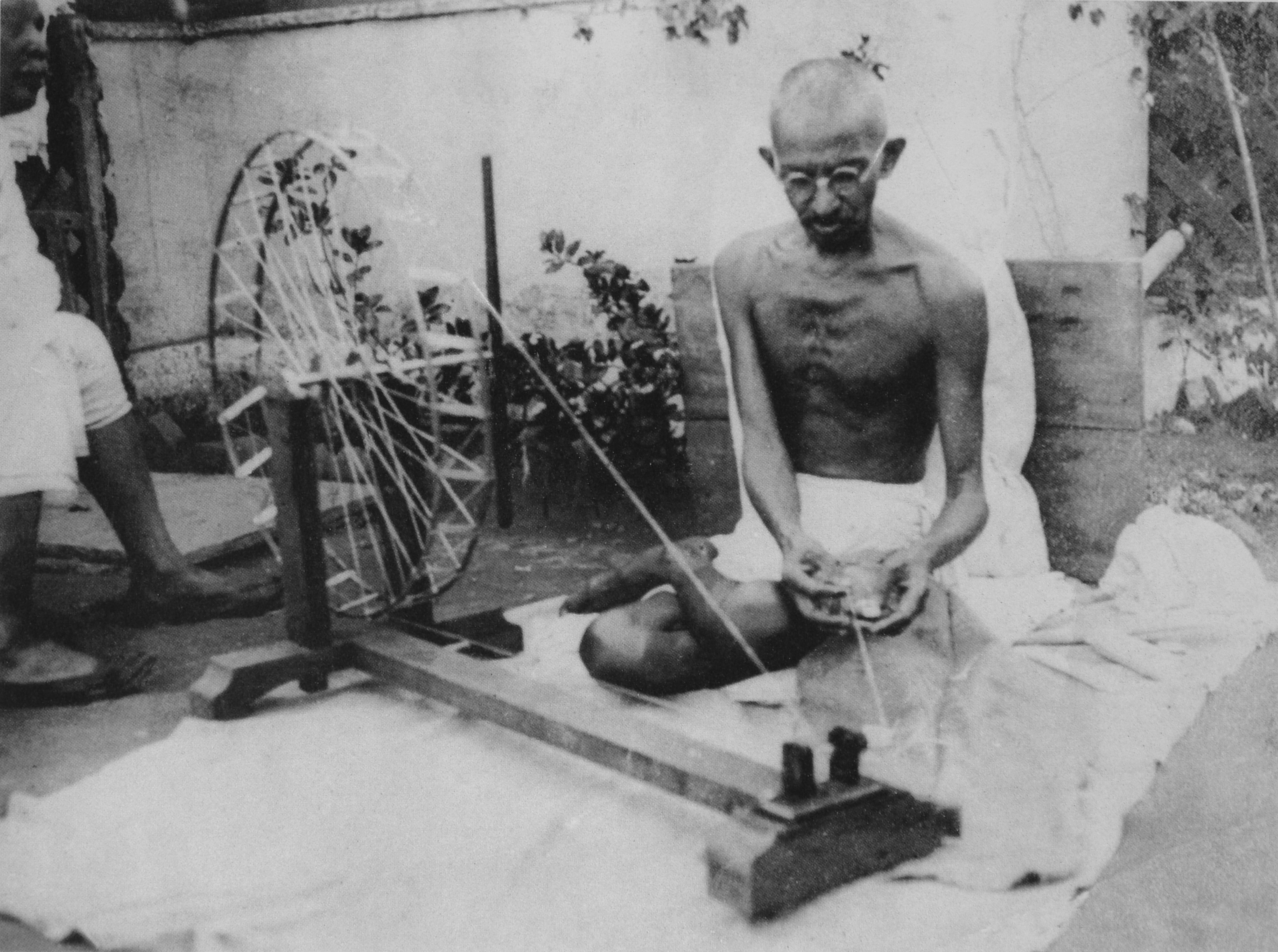
Gandhi spinning yarn, in the late 1920s

Another argument which Tagore tackles, is the one where it is suggested that even if the charkha is not playing a larger role in rejuvenating the masses intellectually, at least it provides constructive economic activity at the domestic level. Tagore does not really challenge this argument, but only points out that there can be several such interventions in the personal sphere where one can make a constructive contribution by incorporating a small change in daily habits. He therefore contends, while the spinning of the charkha maybe viewed as an activity which is beneficial by itself, its actual harm is in its undue importance as a symbol over all other such interventions.

Furthermore, Tagore does not like the idea of the charkha invading the personal space of the individual, where his idea of leisure is one which must be measured along matrices of constructivity and productivity. Here Tagore makes a theological point by claiming that the ultimate shudra (low caste) is actually the machine, because it is the job of the shudra to facilitate the convenience of man's labor. The idea of privileging a machine as the centre of a man's universe does not appeal much to Tagore.

== Relationship with the Mahatma ==
Tagore addresses Gandhi reverentially in the end of his essay, by proclaiming him as a being of "great moral personality" and an embodiment of shakti (divine energy) provided to the people of India by providence itself. However, he humbly chooses to differ with Gandhi on the subject of the charkha.

Thus, Tagore himself saw the essay as a critique of the politics and ideology of the charkha but in no way as an attack on Gandhi as the leader of the Indian masses. Tagore offers the essay as a personal document on why he does not endorse the Gandhian ethic of the charkha but clarifies that he believes in the larger moral authority of the Mahatma and only prays that the Indian masses can live up to the standards set by him.

Mahatma Gandhi wrote a reply to Tagore's essay in the November issue of Young India, addressing the major points of disagreement with the latter's position.
