= Chaturanga (Tagore novel) =

1916 novel by Rabindranath Tagore

Chaturanga / Quartet
- Author: Rabindranath Tagore
- Original title: চতুরঙ্গ (Chaturanga)
- Language: Bengali
- Publication date: 1916

Chaturanga (Bengali: চতুরঙ্গ; English: Quartet) is a novel by Rabindranath Tagore, considered a landmark in Bengali literature. The novel was published in 1916. The story of the novel follows the journey of a young man named Sreebilas (the narrator), his meeting with his best friend, philosopher, and guide Sachis, and the story of Damini a widow, and Jyathamoshai, an idealist person.

== Plot ==
Sachis is an English-educated young man who transitions from his uncle's rationalism into intense spiritual fervor under a religious sect. Sachis, the main protagonist of the story has returned from England after his education. Damini is an independent young woman widowed at a very early age. She rebels against religious orthodox society. Sribilash is also well educated and fried of Sachis. Sribilash also acts as the narrator of the story. Damini has affection for Sribilash. Swami Leelananada is Sachis' spiritual guru who guides him in various ways. Sachis' uncle Jyathamoshai is an atheist and of rational modern thinking who opposes untouchability. He dies while serving victims of plague.

== Style and themes ==
The novel consists of four chapters, each named after the main characters of the novel. Thus, it is named Chaturanga, which in Sanskrit means "four parts," a "quartet." Many contemporary critics also regard it as a short story rather than novel that narrate same incidents from different point of views. Pulinbihari Sen and Subhendusekhar Mukhopadhyay, who have compiled Tagore's bibliography list down Chaturanga under both categories of novel and short story. Critic Subodh Chandra Sengupta also hestiates to call it a novel as it does not have the "gradual building of plot on character we expect from a novel". Masti Venkatesha Iyengar calls it a short story and Humayun Kabir calls it a "long story rather than a novel". Ashok Mitra translated the story in English and in his notes he classifies it as a novella.

== Editions and reception ==
Critics also compare this with Tagore novel The Home and the World (Ghôre Baire) published in same year as having same writing techniques; but different theme. The novel was first published as a series of four stories in the magazine Sabujpatra, edited by Pramatha Chaudhuri.

The Bengali film Chaturanga, based on the novel, was released in 2008 and was directed by Suman Mukherjee. Mukherjee states that the issue of "man-woman relationships, the position of women in society" included in the novel are relevant and unanswered even then during the making of the film; nearly a century after the novel was first published.
