= Rabindra Nritya Natya =

Dance-dramas by Rabindranath Tagore

Rabindra Nritya Natya is a group of several dance-dramas composed by Bengal's Nobel laureate Rabindranath Tagore: Chitrangada, Chandalika, Shyama, Shaaapmochan, Bhanu Singha Padabali and Shrabangatha. The principal characteristic of these works is that the story is told entirely through dance and song. The dances included in them were in the dance form created by Tagore. Tagore also included dance in earlier works such as Tasher Desh (lit. 'The Country of Cards'), though these are not regarded as Rabindra Nritya Natya.

== See also ==
- Santiniketan
