= Valmiki-Pratibha =

Vālmīki-Pratibhā (Bengali: বাল্মীকি-প্রতিভা, Balmiki Protibha, lit. The Genius of Vālmīki) is an opera by Rabindranath Tagore. The Bengali libretto was written by Tagore himself based on the legend of Ratnakara the Thug who later became Sage Valmiki and composed Ramayana, a Hindu epic.

Composed in 1881, the opera was first performed at the Jorasanko Thakur Bari on 26 February 1881. Tagore himself played the role of Valmiki. It was staged in front of some eminent literary personalities of contemporary Bengal like Bankim Chandra Chattopadhyay, Gooroodas Banerjee and Haraprasad Shastri. The first edition of the opera was also published this time. The second and final edition was published on 20 February 1886.

The music of this opera was a "fusion of classical, folk and European strains." The story narrates how Ratnakara, a robber chief turns into a great poet by the grace of Saraswati, the goddess of wisdom.

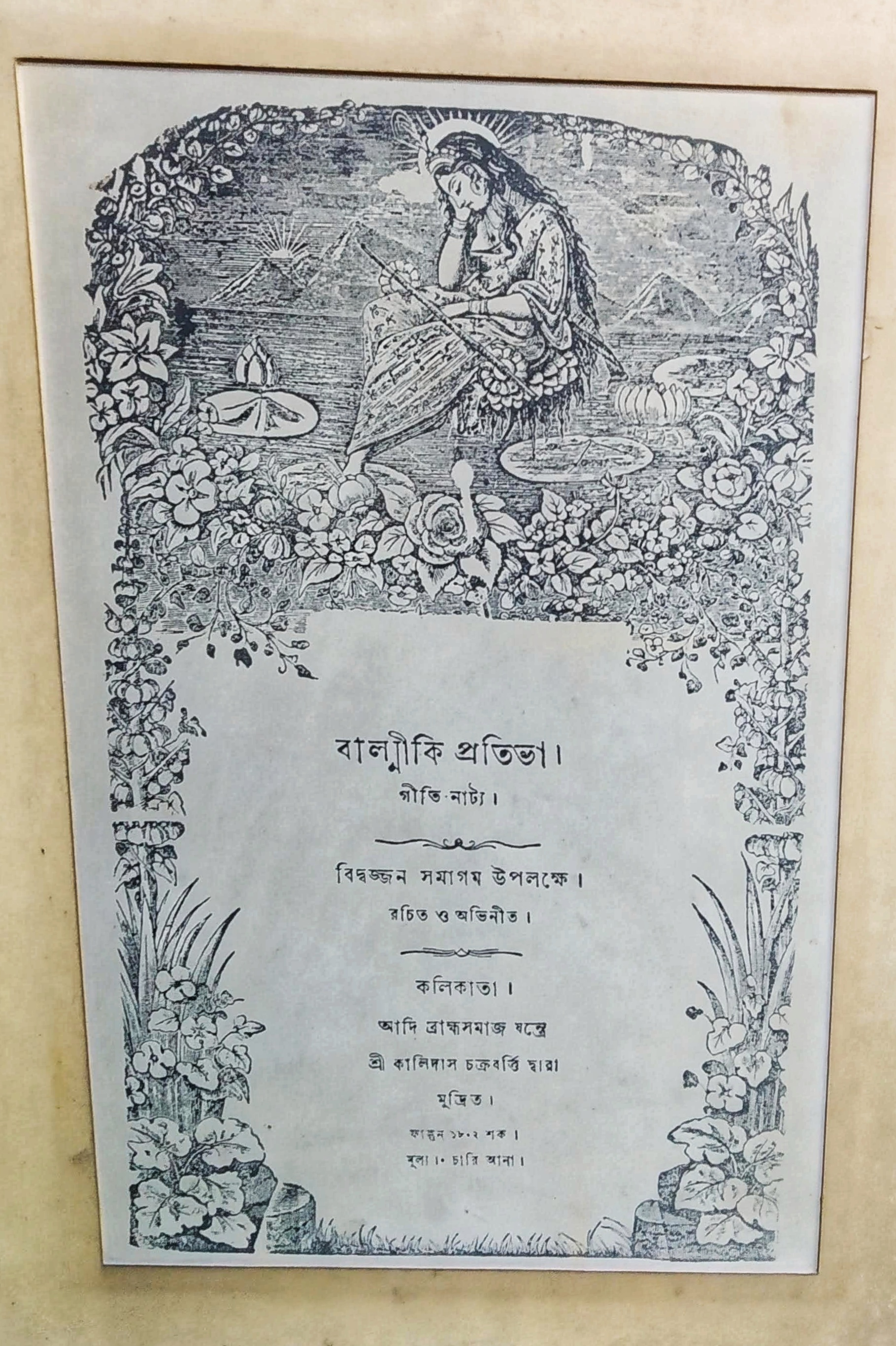
Vakmiki Pratibha Print Cover

== Name ==
Tagore wrote in his reminiscence, Jibansmriti, "[In Valmiki-Pratibha] I played Valmiki and my niece Pratibha played Saraswati – this history remains in the naming of Valmiki-Pratibha."

== Synopsis ==
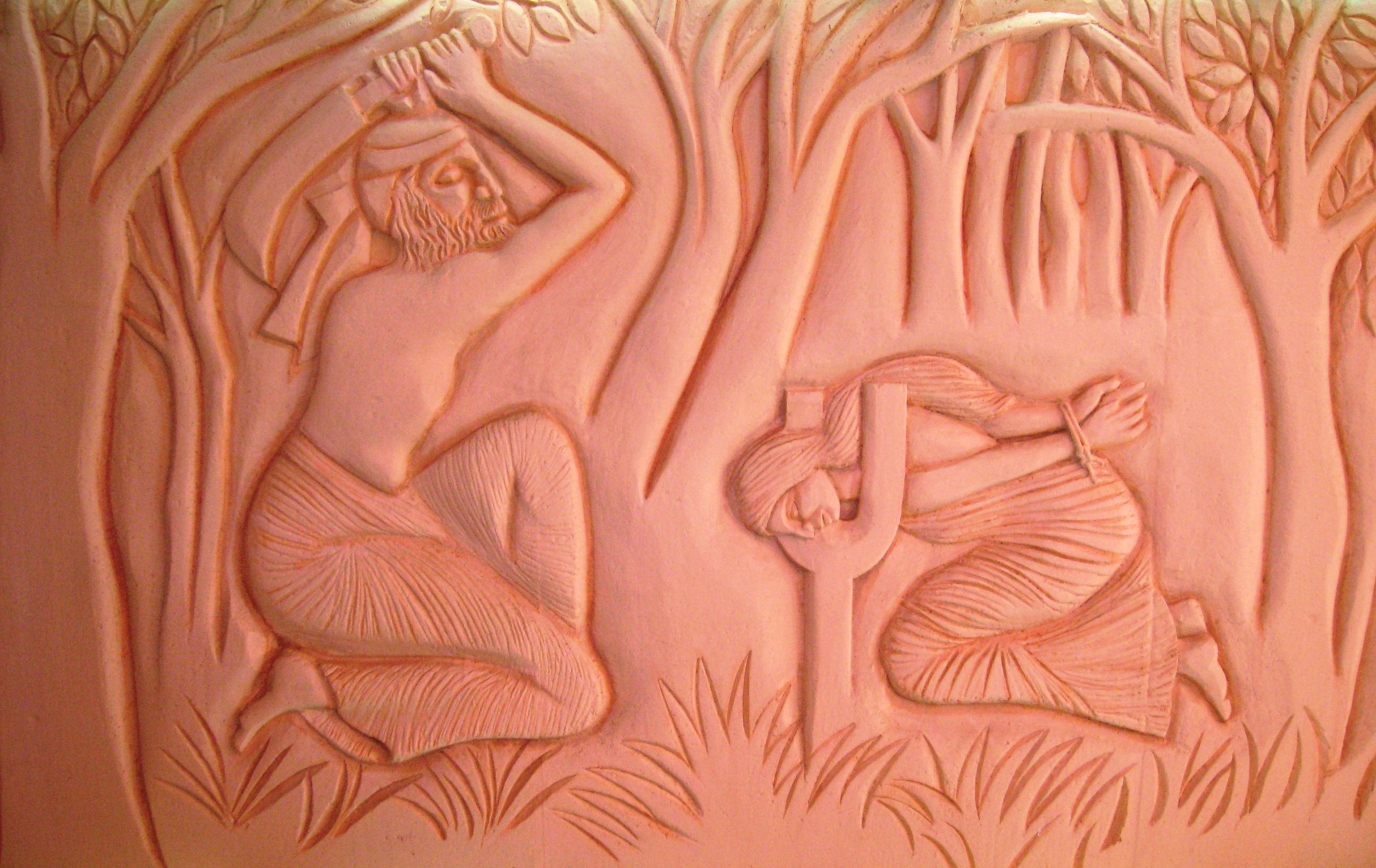
Mural from Valmiki-Pratibha, at a Durga Puja pandal in Kolkata, 2010

One night, Valmiki, the robber chief, and his men captured a young girl to be sacrificed before Kali, the goddess of death. As Valmiki approached to behead the girl, her cries melt the robber chief's heart and she was released. Later Valmiki's men found that their leader was taking no more pleasure in bloodshed. Considering it as a sign of shameful cowardice, they abandoned him. Valmiki began to wander in the forest. One day he saw a young hunter killing two innocent love birds. Enraged, he uttered a curse which came out in Sanskrit, the language of the gods that he never learnt. Valmiki saw an image of Saraswati, the goddess of wisdom being worshipped by the forest-nymphs. He renounced Kali and began his long search for the goddess of knowledge. In the meantime, Lakshmi, the goddess of fortune, approached to distract him, but he refused her. At last his penance was rewarded and Saraswati herself appeared to him. It turned out that the little girl that he had saved from beheading was none other than the goddess herself in disguise, who had come to melt his 'stone' heart. Later, the goddess offered her Veena to Valmiki and blessed him with music. She blessed the former robber chief to become the greatest poet in the whole world, to be worshipped next to the goddess herself by every poet or artist ever since.

== Roles and historical cast ==
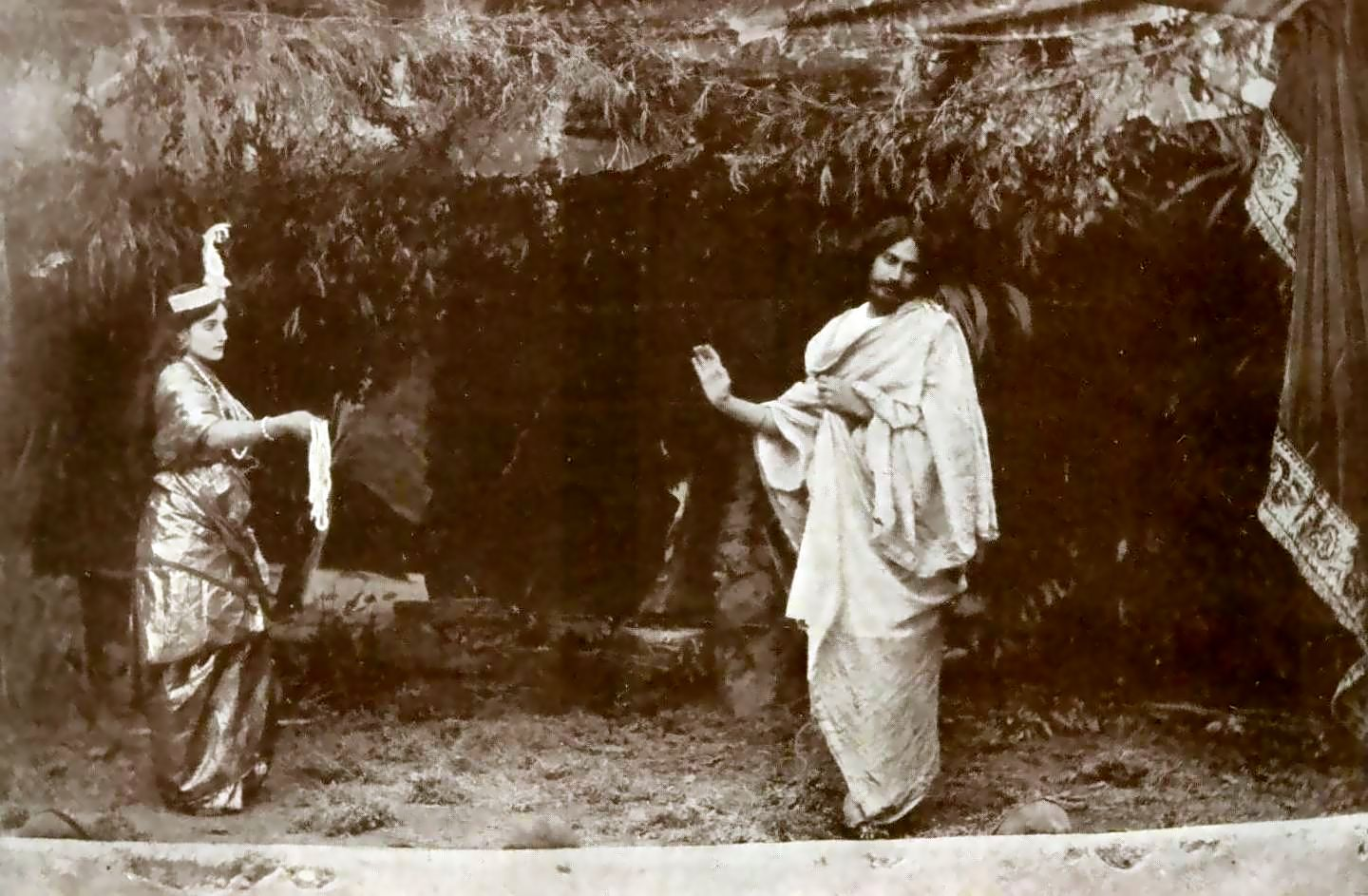
Rabindrnath Tagore (Valmiki) and Indira Devi (Lakshmi) in Vālmīki-Praṭibhā

In the list below, the role is followed by the original cast member from the 1881 production.

- Valmiki, the robber chief – Rabindranath Tagore.
- Saraswati, goddess of wisdom – Pratibha Devi, Tagore's niece.
- Lakshmi, goddess of fortune – Sushila Devi, Tagore's niece.
- Robbers – Sarada Prasad Ganguly, Kedarnath Majumdar, Akshay Majumdar.

== Recording ==
- 1967, Santosh Sengupta (conductor), Hemanta Mukherjee (Valmiki), Suchitra Mitra (Saraswati), Tarun Bandyopadhyay (robber), Sagar Sen (robber), Arghya Sen (robber), Sumitra Sen (forest-nymph), Ritu Guha (Lakshmi) etc. (The Gramophone Company of India Limited, EALP 1313)

== Sources ==
- Ghose, Sisir Kumar (2006). Rabindranath Tagore.Sahitya Akademi. ISBN 81-260-1994-8
- Guha-Thakurta, P. (2000). The Bengali drama: its origin and development. Routledge. ISBN 0-415-24504-4
- Hochman, Stanley (ed.) (1984). "Tagore, Rabindranath", McGraw-Hill encyclopedia of world drama, Volume 5, pp. 1–2. VNR AG. ISBN 0-07-079169-4
