= Where the Hell is Matt? =

Viral video

Screenshot from "Where the Hell is Matt? 2005". It shows Matt Harding in Hanoi, Vietnam while doing the jig

Where the Hell is Matt? is an internet phenomenon that features a video of Dancing Matt (Matt Harding) doing a dance "jig" in many different places around the world in 2005. The video garnered popularity on the video sharing site YouTube. There are now five major videos plus two outtakes and several background videos on YouTube. Matt dances alone in the first videos. In 2008 others join with him doing the dance "jig"; in 2010 he does the Diski Dance in South Africa. In 2012 he works with other dancers, sometimes using a local dance or another dance step.

== Background ==
While working in Australia for Activision on the project All Humans Must Die, Harding claimed that: "My life had become this rhythmic migration from bubble to bubble. You wake up in your apartment bubble, you get in your car bubble, you go to your work bubble, you get in your car, and then you go to you know, whatever, the outdoor shopping plaza bubble, back in your car bubble, back in your apartment bubble. There wasn't a lot of exposure to the outside world ... it's really insulating." Quitting his job he traveled the world from 2003 to 2004, known by his friends for a particular dance, and while video recording each other in Vietnam in May 2003, his travel companions suggested he add the dance. The videos were uploaded to his website for friends and family to enjoy. After completing a second journey to Africa in 2004, Harding edited together 15 dance scenes, all with him center frame, with the background music "Sweet Lullaby" by Deep Forest. The original song uses samples from a dying Solomon Islands language which was recorded in 1971 by a French ethnomusicologist at the Solomon Islands near Papua New Guinea. The song, "Rorogwela" was sung by a young woman named Afunakwa. According to the video "Where the Hell is Afunakwa" by Matt Harding, Afunakwa died in 1998.

The video was passed around by e-mail and eventually became popular, with his server getting 20,000 or more hits a day as it was discovered, generally country by country due to language barriers, before the launch of major video upload sites.

Harding created a second version of the video in 2006, with additional dancing scenes from subsequent travels, called "Dancing 2006". At the request of Stride, a gum brand, he accepted sponsorship of this video, since he usually travels on a limited budget. Harding states:

"I went in very wary about working with a corporate sponsor but ... they didn't want to make a commercial for their gum out of it. They've got commercials; you can see them on TV all the time. But they'd seen what was going on on the internet – and by that time YouTube had taken off and it was becoming a big deal ... and a lot of companies they want to be a part of that. But it's very very difficult, too, because as soon as a company gets in there and starts making things, we as viewers, a switch flicks in your head and you know you are watching an ad and you interpret it differently. So they said, 'We want to help you make it, but we're not making it.'"

The video, with more than 18 million views, shows Harding dancing for 3 to 7 seconds apiece in 36 locations mostly in front of distinct landmarks. The evident advertising only comes with two Stride logo watermarked scenes halfway into the video and a final credit. In August 2008, Harding gave a talk at the Ignite conference in Seattle where he described how dancing by himself had become "boring" whereas dancing with others was far more interesting. For his newest video Harding had developed a listserv for every country from which he received an email, created a digital sign-up sheet for visit requests, and notified people when he would come to their country. Released on June 20, 2008, the third video is the product of 14 months of traveling in 42 countries. The background music/song of this video is known as "Praan" composed by Garry Schyman and sung by Palbasha Siddique, with lyrics adapted from the poem "Stream of Life", a part of the Gitanjali by Rabindranath Tagore. As well as the Youtube videos, a wide Visa advertising campaign appeared across 8 countries including in cinema advertising in 2008.

As of August 2008, Harding is represented by Creative Artists Agency. His videos are viewable on YouTube, Google Video, Vimeo and his own site. His "Where the Hell is Matt? (2008)" video has been watched over 43,700,000 times on YouTube since 2011 and Harding's YouTube channel is ranked "#83 - Most Subscribed (All Time) - Directors" as of December 22, 2010.

Drawing on the practice of Culture Jams, the Situationist International movement and the practices of incorporation and excorporation, Milstein and Pulos conclude that "while some of Harding's videos are tied to corporate sponsorship, the arc of his projects also argues for the possibility of reorienting oneself with others to keep one step ahead of incorporation – even, ironically, while actively sponsored. This sense of possibility is essential in contemporary society as even not-for-profit public institutions – including universities and philanthropic organizations – seek out sponsorship from multinational corporations."

In November 2015, Harding launched a Kickstarter campaign to fund the making of a new video. Backers were allowed to vote on places where they would like him to go to for his new videos and he raised $146,075 out of a $125,000 goal. Via social media, he also broadcast the places where he would be dancing and invited netizens to participate in the making of his new video. By October 2016, he had finished his global dancing tour and was finalizing the edit of the video.

== Major media coverage ==
Harding's video clips have appeared on television shows including:

- The Screen Savers (March 17, 2005)
- MSNBC's Countdown with Keith Olbermann (August 18, 2005)
- Inside Edition (August 19, 2005)
- The Ellen DeGeneres Show (October 10, 2005)
- Rude Tube (February 15, 2008)
- 40 Greatest Internet Celebrities on VH1
- Jimmy Kimmel Live! (August 6, 2008)
- Enough Rope (August 18, 2008)
- The Daily Show (November 6, 2008)
- Good Morning America (May 31, 2006)

In 2007, Jawed Karim, one of the founders of YouTube, stated that Harding's video was his favorite on YouTube at that time.

On July 22, 2008, and again on July 25, 2010, and July 10, 2012, and June 14, 2020, NASA featured Harding's videos on the APOD (Astronomy Picture of the Day) Web site. Text accompanying these videos, under the heading "Happy People Dancing on Planet Earth", claims that humans worldwide share a common love of dance, stating that "few people are able to watch the above video without smiling." Harding himself has joked that he is impressed by his appearances on APOD, especially since his videos have nothing to do with astronomy, nor are they pictures.

== Hoax ==
On December 11, 2008, Matt Harding sarcastically revealed at the Entertainment Gathering that "everyone knows how easy it is to 'fake things' on the internet." According to this confession, the videos were an elaborate hoax, Harding was not a game designer but rather an actor hired by a viral marketing New York ad agency, and the videos were made using animatronic puppets and extensive video editing. His presentation included a pie chart of supposed expenses, such as $1 million for "robot uprising insurance". Harding's hoax was lost on many when his talk was posted online, with a larger public perceiving the prank as an actual confession. A month after his presentation, criticism was so widespread that at the Macworld convention Harding revealed the "hoax about the hoax" and joked that many people took it seriously. He explained he came up with the prankster idea when he himself felt duped by a viral video titled "Bike Hero", which turned out to be a marketing campaign. He also made it very clear that the videos he made were indeed real.

== Legacy ==
In October 2026, Harding appeared in Mozilla's Come Back to Firefox advertising campaign, alongside several other viral internet personalities from the 2000s and 2010s. The campaign used nostalgia for early internet culture to promote Firefox.
