= Chitto Jetha Bhayshunyo =

Poem by Rabindranath Tagore

"Where the mind is without fear" (Bengali: চিত্ত যেথা ভয়শূন্য, romanized: Chitto Jetha Bhoyshunno) is a poem written by 1913 Nobel laureate Rabindranath Tagore before India's independence. It represents Tagore's vision of a new and awakened India. The original poem was published in 1910 in Naivedya and, in Tagore's own translation, the 35th poem of Gitanjali, the 1912 English edition. It is one of Tagore's most anthologised poems.

It is an expression of the poet's reflective spirit and contains a simple prayer for his country, the India of pre-independence times.

== Original Bengali script ==
চিত্ত যেথা ভয়শূন্য, উচ্চ যেথা শির,
জ্ঞান যেথা মুক্ত, যেথা গৃহের প্রাচীর
আপন প্রাঙ্গণতলে দিবসশর্বরী
বসুধারে রাখে নাই খণ্ড ক্ষুদ্র করি,
যেথা বাক্য হৃদয়ের উৎসমুখ হতে
উচ্ছ্বসিয়া উঠে, যেথা নির্বারিত স্রোতে
দেশে দেশে দিশে দিশে কর্মধারা ধায়
অজস্র সহস্রবিধ চরিতার্থতায়,
যেথা তুচ্ছ আচারের মরুবালুরাশি
বিচারের স্রোতঃপথ ফেলে নাই গ্রাসি,
পৌরুষেরে করে নি শতধা, নিত্য যেথা
তুমি সর্ব কর্ম চিন্তা আনন্দের নেতা,
নিজ হস্তে নির্দয় আঘাত করি, পিতঃ;
ভারতেরে সেই স্বর্গে করো জাগরিত৷

== English translation ==
Tagore's own translation found in the 1912 English edition of Gitanjali ran:

Where the mind is without fear and the head is held high;
Where knowledge is free;
Where the world has not been broken up into fragments by narrow domestic walls;
Where words come out from the depth of truth;
Where tireless striving stretches its arms towards perfection;
Where the clear stream of reason has not lost its way into the dreary desert sand of dead habit;
Where the mind is led forward by thee into ever-widening thought and action—
Into that heaven of freedom, my Father, let my country awake.

== History and translation ==
This poem was most likely composed in 1900. It appeared in the volume Naivedya in the poem titled "Prarthona" (July 1901, Bengali 1308 Bangabda). The English translation was composed around 1911 when Tagore was translating some of his work into English after a request from William Rothenstein. It appeared as poem 35 in the English Gitanjali, published by The India Society, London, in 1912. In 1917, Tagore read out the English version (then titled 'Indian Prayer') at the Indian National Congress session in Calcutta.

As in most of Tagore's translations for the English Gitanjali, almost every line of the English rendering has been considerably simplified. Line 6 in the English version omits a reference to manliness (পৌরুষ), and the stern ending of the original, where the Father is being enjoined to "strike the sleeping nation without mercy" has been softened.

This poem often appears in textbooks in India and is also popular in Bangladesh. There is a Sinhala translation of this song by the name "Mage Deshaya Avadi Karanu Mana Piyaneni" (Sinhala: මාගේ දේශය අවදි කරනු මැන පියාණෙනි; lit. "My father, let my country awake") which was translated into Sinhala by Mahagama Sekara.

== Legacy ==
In July 2026, film artist Andrea Jeremiah quoted lines from the poem, emphasising the phrase "where knowledge is free," while speaking at an anti-NEET protest at Rajarathinam Stadium in Chennai, Tamil Nadu.

== See also ==
- Freedom of thought
- Independence Day (India)
- National revival
