= Stream of Life =

Poem by Rabindranath Tagore

"Stream of Life" is a Bengali poem written by Indian Nobel Laureate Rabindranath Tagore and translated by him into English. It first appeared in the collection Gitanjali, where it is numbered #69 out of the 157 poems; Tagore received the Nobel Prize for Literature in 1913 for its English translation, Song Offerings.

The poem consists of five sentences, with the first phrase — "The same stream of life..." — providing the English title. Tagore repeats the phrase "the same life" as he likens the life within him (the blood in his veins) to the sap in grass and flowers, to the ebb and flow of "the ocean-cradle," to the rhythms in music and dancing, and to the flowing stream of time.

== In popular culture ==
=== "Praan" ===
Retitled "Praan" for a song version, which was set to music composed by Garry Schyman and sung by Palbasha Siddique, the poem gained worldwide fame as the lyrics for the score of Matt Harding's viral "Where the Hell is Matt? 2008" video. The Minnesota online news site MinnPost reported at the time, "The video was downloaded to the web on Saturday, June 20, 2008. By Sunday, it had 1 million hits." The song went on to be among the top ten of Amazon's soundtrack downloads over a week and was also in the top 100 of all of its MP3 downloads in 2009.

The lyrics, which are in Bengali, run:

Bengali	English transliteration	Word for Word translation
প্রাণ ভুলবো না আর সহজেতে সেই প্রাণে মন উঠবে মেতে মৃত্যু মাঝে ঢাকা আছে যে অন্তহীন প্রাণ বজ্রে তোমার বাজে বাঁশি সেকি সহজ গান সেই সুরেতে জাগবো আমি সেই ঝড় যেন সই আনন্দে চিত্তবীণার তারে সপ্তসিন্ধু দশ দিগন্ত নাচাও যে ঝঙ্কারে বজ্রে তোমার বাজে বাঁশি সেকি সহজ গান সেই সুরেতে জাগবো আমি	Praan Bhulbona ar shohojete Shei praan e mon uthbe mete Mrittu majhe dhaka ache je ontohin praan Bojre tomar baje bashi She ki shohoj gaan Shei shurete jagbo ami Shei jhor jeno shoi anonde Chittobinar taare Shopto-Shindhu dosh digonto Nachao je jhonkare!	Life I shall not ever easily forget, My heart shall fill up with life, Even in death, lies hidden That endless life In the lightning and thunder, your flute plays, But that is no ordinary tune, I shall wake up to that tune. X2 In the lightning and thunder, your flute plays, But that is no ordinary tune, Let me have, that very tune. May I happily weather that storm, Even on the verge of lifelessness, Across 7 rivers, in 10 directions, Make us dance with your tune.

However, the song that has been titled "Praan" appears to be wrongly linked to "Stream of Life" as the lyrics refer to a different poem by Tagore titled Bajre Tomar Baje Bashi.

In 2013, Canadian journalist Amitava Kar wrote a feature story about Harding, Schyman, Siddique, and "Praan" for The Daily Star in Bangladesh. When Harding received commercial backing for his "Dancing 2008" video, he needed original music and contacted Schyman. Harding had been a video game designer, and Schyman had composed for video games, but, he told Kar, "I almost said no because I did not understand the concept. Besides, I am an orchestra composer. I am not a song writer or a lyricist."

Since Harding wanted "a non-English approach," Schyman suggested a Tagore poem. Harding read Gitanjali and chose "Stream of Life." Schyman explained, "I actually wrote the melody and chord changes before setting it to Tagore's poem." The score was performed by a 25-piece orchestra.

Harding's girlfriend searched online videos for someone who could sing in Bangla, the Bengali language, and saw Siddique. When they heard her demo, Kar wrotes, "everyone was blown away. She kind of ignored his melody and did her own improvisation over it. Now they had hit the jackpot," and in retrospect everyone saw it as serendipity. Harding told Kar, "I knew the poem in English, but had no idea how it would sound in Bangla. Palbasha did the work of fitting the poem to the music Garry had written and it came together perfectly in the recording. I did very little to make Praan happen. I chose talented people to work with and then got out of their way."

Kar noted another example of the popularity of "Praan": after Barack Obama won the 2008 United States presidential election, American political satirist Jon Stewart played the video in the background in an episode of The Daily Show.
