= Middle years of Rabindranath Tagore =

The middle years of Rabindranath Tagore were spent primarily in Santiniketan, although they included extensive travels throughout Asia, Europe, and Japan.

== Santiniketan ==
In 1901, Tagore left Shelaidaha and moved to Shantiniketan, about one hundred miles to Calcutta's northwest in what is now West Bengal. Shantiniketan, a spread of relatively arid and eroded red soil of seven acres bought in the 1860s by Debendranth, was made the home of Tagore's new ashram, a marble-floored prayer hall ("The Mandir"), experimental school, groves of trees, gardens, and a library. Unfortunately, his wife along with two of his children, Renuka (in 1903) and Samindranath (in 1907), died in this period, leaving Tagore distraught. When Tagore's father, aged 87, also died on 19 January 1905, Tagore began receiving 1,250–1,500 rupees (Rs.) monthly as an inheritance. This combined with income from the Maharaja of Tripura, sales of jewelry owned by him and his late wife, his bungalow at the seaside Puri, and mediocre royalties (Rs. 2,000) gleaned from the licensed publishing of thousands of copies of his works.

Thus he gained a large following among Bengali readers. He published such works as Naivedya (1901) and Kheya (1906). Non-Bangla translations were also published, but these were frequently of mediocre quality. In response to requests by admirers (including painter William Rothenstein), Tagore began translating his poems into free verse.

== Travels ==
In 1913, he went to England while carrying a sheaf of his translated works. At readings there, these works impressed a number of Englishmen, including English missionary and Gandhi protégé Charles F. Andrews, Anglo-Irish poet William Butler Yeats, Ezra Pound, Robert Bridges, Ernest Rhys, and Thomas Sturge Moore. Indeed, Yeats later wrote the preface to the English translation of Gitanjali (published by the India Society), while Andrews joined Tagore in India to work with him.

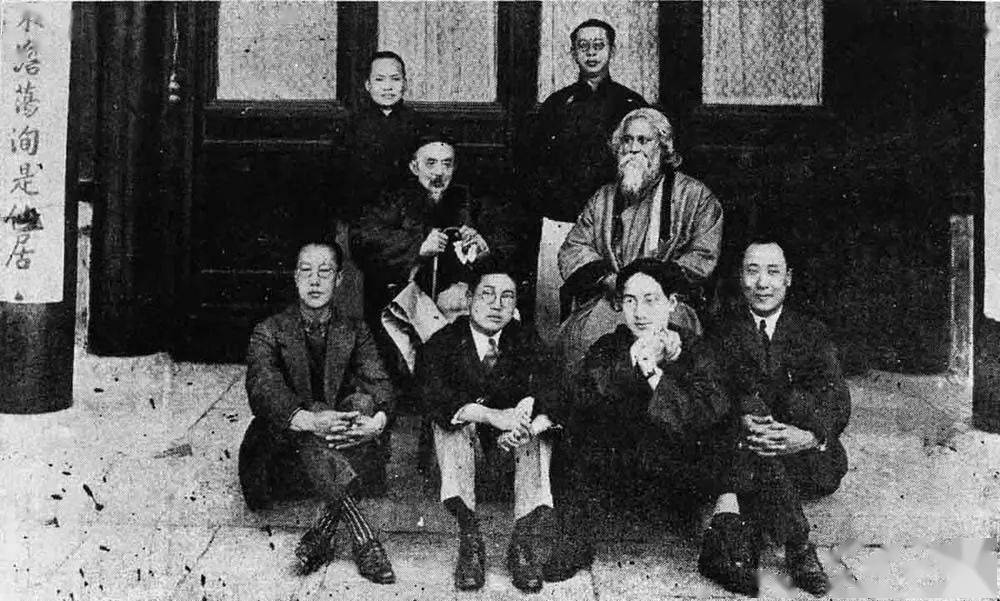
Tagore (center, at right) visits with academics at Tsinghua University (清華大學) during an extended journey to China in 1924. (泰戈尔在清华大学讲学).

On 10 November 1912, Tagore traveled to the United States, speaking at a Unitarian church in Urbana, Illinois. In that year, Tagore also toured the United Kingdom, meeting William Rothenstein and William Butler Yeats, who read his Gitanjali. Later, he stayed in Butterton, Staffordshire with C.F. Andrews' clergymen friends. On 14 November 1913, he received word that he had won the Nobel Prize in Literature; the award stemmed from the idealistic and accessible (for Western readers) nature of a small body of translated material, including the 1912 Gitanjali: Song Offerings.

Together with Mukul Dey, Charles F. Andrews and W. W. Pearson, Tagore again set off by boat on 3 May 1916, embarking on a lecturing circuit of Japan and the United States that was intended to last until April 1917. During a four-month layover in Japan, Tagore authored "On the Way to Japan" and "In Japan", which were later compiled into the book Japanyatri ("A Sojourn to Japan"), which detailed his admiration for the Japanese aesthetic. Yet Tagore also denounced nationalism, particularly that of the Japanese and Americans. He wrote the essay "Nationalism in India", attracting both derision and praise (the latter from pacifists and fellow internationalists like Romain Rolland). Yet these views also endangered him: during his stay in a San Francisco hotel, Tagore narrowly escaped being assassinated by a pair of Indian expatriates — the plot failed only because the would-be assassins fell into argument concerning whether they should carry through with the murder. The following morning, Tagore left for Santa Barbara, near Los Angeles. There, Tagore meditated among orange groves and conceived of a new type of university, desiring to "make Shantiniketan the connecting thread between India and the world ... [and] a world center for the study of humanity ... somewhere beyond the limits of nation and geography."

In 1924, Tagore held numerous lectures in China. He argued that China could encounter trouble by integrating too much progressive and Western thoughts into Chinese society.

== Visva-Bharati University ==
The foundation stone of the school, which he named Visva-Bharati, (Note: Etymology of "Visva-Bharati": from the Sanskrit for "world" or "universe" and the name of a Rigvedic goddess ("Bharati") associated with Saraswati, the Hindu patron of learning.(Dutta & Robinson 1995, p. 220) "Visva-Bharati" also translates as "India in the World".) was ceremonially laid on 22 December 1918 and the school was later inaugurated on 22 December 1921. The motto of the university reflected Tagore's vision of universalism. Tagore's duties as steward and mentor at Santiniketan kept him busy; he taught classes in mornings and wrote textbooks for his students in afternoons and evenings. Of this routine, he wrote that "I long to discover some fairyland of holidays ... where all duties look delightfully undutiful, like clouds bearing rain appearing perfectly inconsequential". Tagore was also occupied with fundraising between 1919 and 1921, undertaking trips to Europe and the U.S.

== See also ==
- Early life of Rabindranath Tagore

== Sources ==
- Chakravarty, A (1961), A Tagore Reader, Beacon Press, ISBN 0-8070-5971-4.
- Dutta, K; Robinson, A (1995), Rabindranath Tagore: The Myriad-Minded Man, St. Martin's Press, ISBN 0-312-14030-4.
- Hjärne, H (1913), "The Nobel Prize in Literature 1913", Nobel Foundation.
- Tagore Festival Committee (2006), "History of the Tagore Festival", College of Business, University of Illinois at Urbana-Champaign, archived from the original on 13 June 2015.
