= Residual media =

Old media forms retaining cultural value

Residual media refers to media that are not new media, but are nonetheless still prevalent in society. The term is offered as an alternative to the term old media. Residual media attempts to act as a corrective to the idea that when media become old, they absolutely become obsolete, or “dead media.” Residual media “reveals that, ultimately, new cultural phenomena rely on encounters with the old”. While old media can, and often does, become obsolete, they do not die. Instead, old media persist in our culture—either in storage units or landfills, or as cultural capital for niche groups—or they can be moved to other parts of the world and other cultures. Regardless of where they end up, the media is not dead, they are still very much living, changing, and evolving. Residual media helps show that the transition between old and new media is not simplistic, well-defined, or sweeping. Examples of residual media include film cameras and film, record players and LP records, radio, letters, and postcards, etc.

== History ==
Residual media was first defined in the edited collection Residual Media by Charles R. Acland. The term itself stems from Raymond Williams' study of culture’s dominant, emergent, and residual forms. The residual forms, Williams says, are “experiences, meanings and values which cannot be expressed in terms of the dominant culture,” but “are nevertheless lived and practiced on the basis of residue—cultural as well as social—of some previous social formation”. In relation to media, the dominant culture would be new media, while the residual would be the forms of media that have come before, but are still in use regardless of the new supplanting them. Williams’s definition of the residual is also important because it emphasizes that these old forms of media are “still active in the cultural process, not only and often not at all as an element of the past, but as an effective element of the present”. Residual media, though antiquated or seen as lesser than the new media, still exists in the present and still affect that which is dominant. The way we interact with the old still informs the way we interact with the new, and the new informs the way we interact with the old. The idea of residual media is closely related to Jay David Bolter and Richard Grusin's theory of Remediation (Marxist theory).

== Examples ==
- The vinyl revival – Since 2006, sales of vinyl records, a form of residual media, have been rising while the sales of CDs, new media, have been dropping. In 2012, vinyl sales in the United States went up 17.7%, while CD sales dropped 13.5%; in the United Kingdom vinyl sales jumped 15.3%, while CD sales dropped 20%. Digital downloads are still the most utilized method of purchasing music, but vinyl records remain culturally relevant.
- Skeuomorphism – is a derivative object that retains ornamental design cues from structures that were necessary in the original. The digital skeuomorphs found in the Evernote application, which displays physical notebooks, or Apple iOS6's Notes app, which looked liked a lined reporter's notebook, show how "old media" still exert a pressure on the new. (For more examples see Skeuomorphs in popular culture)

== See also ==
- Affordance
- Cultural materialism (cultural studies)
- Media intelligence
- New media
- Old media
- Remediation (Marxist theory)
- Skeuomorph
