= Diski =

Diski may refer to:

- Jenny Diski (1947–2016), English novelist, non-fiction writer and memoirist
- Diski Dance, a dance composed of a series of choreographed football moves
