= Richard Grusin =

American new media scholar and author (born 1953)

- Born: Richard Arthur Grusin; September 29, 1953 (age 72)
- Education: University of California, Berkeley
- Known for: New media scholar
- Website: www4.uwm.edu/c21/

Richard Arthur Grusin (born September 29, 1953) is an American new media scholar and author. Grusin is a professor of English at the University of Wisconsin–Milwaukee and former director of the Center for 21st Century Studies.

== Education ==
Grusin earned his bachelor's degree with High Distinction in English at the University of Illinois at Urbana-Champaign in 1976. He earned his Ph.D. in English from the University of California, Berkeley, in 1983.

== Career ==
Grusin has served in both academic and administrative positions throughout his career. He served as an assistant professor in the Department of English at the College of William and Mary from 1983 to 1986. From 1986 to 2001 he taught at Georgia Institute of Technology, where he was chair of the School of Literature, Communication, and Culture from 1996 to 1999. He was professor of English at Wayne State University, where he served as English Department Chair from 2001 to 2008. In 1999–2000 he was visiting associate professor of English and William S. Vaughn Visiting Fellow at the Robert Penn Warren Center for Humanities at Vanderbilt University. In 2007 he served as a visiting professor in media studies at the University of Amsterdam.

== Academic interests ==
Grusin's academic work is fundamentally interdisciplinary; his main interests include various aspects of media, environmental, cultural, and American studies. His scholarly concerns focus on the way that the very questions of representation and mediation that preoccupy us today have manifested themselves historically across western culture.

He is the author of two books in American studies: Transcendentalist Hermeneutics: Institutional Authority and the Higher Criticism of the Bible (1991); and Culture, Technology, and Creation of America’s National Parks (2004).

He is most known for his 1999 book, Remediation: Understanding New Media (co-authored with Jay David Bolter), which is nationally and internationally regarded as a founding text of the field of new media studies. The work is a fundamentally comparative work beginning from the assumption that media do not possess autonomous formal or technical specificity, but that they exist only in relation to other media forms and practices. The book also argues that new media do not present a historical break or rupture with the past, but rather define their newness through the refashioning or re-mediating of older media practices and forms. Remediation remains popular on a global scale in the new media studies realm, and it has been translated into Italian and Korean, with selections also translated into German, Portuguese, Chinese, and Czech.

Grusin's latest book, Premediation: Affect and Mediality After 9/11 (2010), develops and extends the theory of premediation. It argues that at least since the new millennium, networked global media seek to ensure that the future is already pre-mediated before it emerges into the present. The book also explores how the phenomenon of premediation produces and maintains a low level of anxiety in relation both to the global war on terror and to such other post-9/11 threats like climate change, cybersecurity, or financial crises. Grusin posits that in our current era of mobile socially networked media, the function of print, televisual, and networked media is to produce and maintain both individual and collective effects of anticipation, which keep the digital citizens of the 21st-century oriented towards the premediated future.

== Books ==
- Grusin, Richard (1991). Transcendentalist Hermeneutics: Institutional Authority and the Higher Criticism of the Bible. Durham, NC: Duke University Press. 216 pp. ISBN 0-8223-1059-7
- Grusin, Richard and Bolter, Jay David (1999). Remediation: Understanding New Media. Cambridge, Mass: MIT Press. 307 pp. ISBN 0-262-52279-9
- Grusin, Richard (2004). Culture, Technology, and the Creation of America’s National Parks. Cambridge, UK, and New York: Cambridge University Press. 240 pp. ISBN 0521081688
- Grusin, Richard (2010). Premediation: Affect and Mediality After 9/11. London, New York: Palgrave. 240 pp. ISBN 0-230-24252-9
- Grusin, Richard Arthur (2018). After extinction. Center for 21st century studies. Minneapolis [Minnesota]: University of Minnesota Press. ISBN 978-1-5179-0289-6.

== Recognition ==
- Charles H. Gershenson Distinguished Faculty Fellowship Wayne State University, 2009–2011
- Board of Governors Faculty Recognition Award, Wayne State University, 2005
- NEH Fellowship, 1992–1993
- Fellow, NEH Institute on Image and Text in the Eighteenth Century, The Johns Hopkins University, 1988
