= Palbasha Siddique =

American singer

Palbasha Siddique পলবাশা সিদ্দিক
- Born: January 3, 1991 (age 35); Jessore, Bangladesh
- Genres: Pop-rock, fusion, RnB
- Occupations: Singer, songwriter
- Instrument: Vocal
- Years active: 2008–present
- Labels: G-Series, Deadline Music

Palbasha Siddique (born January 3, 1991) is a Bangladeshi American singer. She is best known for her performance of Praan, a song adapted from the collection of poems Gitanjali by Rabindranath Tagore, with music composed by Garry Schyman for Matt Harding's "Dancing 2008" video.

== Early life and career ==
Siddique was born in Bangladesh. She moved to Minneapolis, Minnesota, with her family at age 10. She received a scholarship to MacPhail Center for Music and sang in her schools' choirs and theater programs. At age 11, she sang God Bless America during the seventh-inning stretch at a Minnesota Twins game. She attended De La Salle High School for two years and sang in both the concert and a cappella choirs.

While a 17-year-old student at Southwest High School, Siddique participated in KFAI radio's 1st International Women's Day program with Irina in March 2007. A video clip of her singing for the Minneapolis radio station was posted to YouTube by Rajib Bahar. Harding's co-producer Melissa Nixon found the videos as Schyman was looking for a vocalist to perform "Praan," whose lyrics are written in Bengali and based on poetry by Rabindranath Tagore. Schyman flew Siddique and her mother to Los Angeles for a day of recording in mid-June 2008. "Palbasha was the consummate professional, perfectly in-pitch and absolutely belying her age," Schyman told the Minneapolis Star-Tribune.

The "Dancing 2008" video was posted soon afterward, and Praan climbed into the top-10 list of soundtrack downloads at Amazon.com.

In November 2008, Matt and the vocalist Palbasha were interviewed by KFAI radio in Minnesota. The interview focused on how the "Dance 2008" project came to include Palbasha.

In 2013, Palbasha earned her bachelor's degree in psychology from the University of Minnesota, Twin Cities.

She lives in Chicago now and married to Dr. Durjoy Siddique, a civil engineer and musician. Together they perform their songs as a musical duo known as MOYNA.

== Discography ==
Studio albums

- 2010: Bhalobashi Tai
- 2011: Bhalobashi Tai Bhalobeshe Jai

Compilation albums

- 2011: Shihoron
- 2012: Nari
- 2013: Shomonnoy
- 2013: 360

Singles

- 2009: In loss of all hopes
- 2010: Nijete Phire
- 2010: Nesha- The Addiction
- 2010: Mumbasa TV series title song
- 2015: Tolpar
- 2022: Hoyto

Cover songs

- 2008: Praan - Modern Rabindra song
- 2010: Beautiful Disaster - Kelly Clarkson
- 2010: Don't Stop Believin' - Journey
- 2010: Blackbird - The Beatles
- 2012: Someone like You - Adele
- 2013: Payphone - Maroon 5
- 2013: Young and Beautiful - Lana Del Rey
- 2014: All of Me - John Legend
