= East India Association =

Organisation in London, 1866 to 1966

The East India Association (EIA) was a London-based organisation for matters concerning India. Its members were Indians and retired British officials.

It is noted as the precursor to the Indian National Congress.

== About the Society ==
The East India Association was founded by Dadabhai Naoroji in 1866. The first President of the Association was Lord Lyveden. Meetings were held in Caxton Hall, Westminster. The EIA incorporated the National Indian Association in 1949, and became the Britain, India and Pakistan Association. In 1966 it amalgamated with the Royal India, Pakistan and Ceylon Society, and became the Royal Society for India, Pakistan and Ceylon.

== Publications ==
- Journal of the East India Association - published from 1867 to 1917
- Asiatic Quarterly Review - first published in 1886, renamed the Imperial and Asiatic Quarterly Review and Oriental and Colonial Record, the title reverting to the Asiatic Quarterly Review in 1913, then shortened to Asiatic Review in 1914. Publication ceased in 1952.

== See also ==
- Royal India Society
- National Indian Association
- Royal Society for India, Pakistan and Ceylon
