= Charles R. Acland =

Canadian academic (born 1963)

Charles Reid Acland
- Born: October 4, 1963 (age 63)
- Education: • Carleton University • University of Illinois (PhD)
- Occupations: Professor, (Previous) Department Chair, Communication Studies, Concordia University (2018 - 2020) and Research Chair in Communication Studies, Concordia University
- Writing career
- Language: English, French
- Genre: Academic
- Subjects: Popular culture, media studies, communication studies, cultural theory
- Movement: Residual media
- Website: www.concordia.ca/artsci/coms/faculty.html?fpid=charles-acland

Charles Reid Acland (born October 4, 1963) is a Canadian professor in the Communications Studies Department at Concordia University, Montreal. He specializes in cultural theory and his research interests include film studies, media studies and popular culture. He is the Editor of the Canadian Journal of Film Studies and co-editor of Useful Cinema (Duke University Press, 2011), Residual Media (2007), and Harold Innis in the New Century (1999).

He is also the author of four books: Swift Viewing: The Popular Life of Subliminal Influence (2012), Screen Traffic: Movies, Multiplexes, and Global Culture (2003), Youth, Murder, Spectacle: The Cultural Politics of "Youth in Crisis," (1995), and American Blockbuster (2020).

== Writings ==
Acland has spoken and written about the nonexistence of Subliminal Perception. He was interviewed on this topic on the Colin McEnroe radio show in 2012, and his publication Swift Viewing: The Popular Life of Subliminal Influence asserts that there is no such thing as subliminal perception, at least not in the sense of spectators in a movie theatre being hypnotized to buy popcorn and drinks by having messages flashed at them at speeds beneath the threshold of human perception.

Acland's monograph Screen Traffic: Movies, Multiplexes and Global Culture discusses the business practices and promotional tactics of the film industry in a global context, and explains the history of the multiplex. The publication received positive reviews, and is used as a reference text in media courses.

Acland and co-editor Haidee Wasson have pursued extensive research into "useful cinema", that is, the use of film in institutions such as libraries, museums, and classrooms, as well as the workplace. Acland's Screen essay "Curtains, Carts and the Mobile Screen," which won the Kovacs Prize for Best Essay, from the Society for Cinema and Media Studies in 2010 pursues this concept, as does his reflections on the tachistoscope in Swift Viewing.

Acland coined the phrase "residual media" to describe the phenomena of old media interacting with newer and currently dominant forms. He is a regular contributor on this topic to the online journal of television and media studies Flow.

Acland's book Youth, Murder, Spectacle presents the results of a study of the cultural roots violence among contemporary youth. At the centre of Acland's analysis is the sensationalization and exploitation of the murder of eighteen-year-old Jennifer Levin at the hands of nineteen-year-old Robert Chambers on August 6, 1986 in New York's Central Park.

Acland has also written an extensive collection of essays, Harold Innis in the New Century which synthesize and assess the work and influence of Harold Innis, an economist, historian and essayist, who developed the foundations of the field of Communication Studies.

== Selected publications ==
- 2012. Acland, Charles R. Swift Viewing: The Popular Life of Subliminal Influence, Duke University Press, pp. 328.
- 2011. Acland, Charles R. and Haidee Wasson (editors). Useful Cinema, edited with Haidee Wasson, Duke University Press, pp. 386.
- 2007. Acland, Charles R. (editor). Residual Media, University of Minnesota Press, pp. 416.
- 2003. Acland, Charles R. Screen Traffic: Movies, Multiplexes, and Global Culture. Duke U. Press, pp 337.
- 1999. Acland, Charles R. and William Buxton (editors). Harold Innis in the New Century: Reflections and Refractions, Montreal: McGill-Queen's U. Press, pp. 435.
- 1995. Acland, Charles R. Youth, Murder, Spectacle: The Cultural Politics of "Youth in Crisis," Boulder, CO.: Westview Press

.

== Awards ==
- 2019, Distinguished University Research Professor, Concordia University
- 2011, Useful Cinema, edited with Haidee Wasson, Duke University Press, pp. 386. Awarded honorable mention as the 2013 SCMS Best Edited Book and finalist for the 2012 Kraszna-Krausz Best Moving Image Book Award.
- 2009, "Curtains, Carts and the Mobile Screen," Screen, 50.1, 148–166. Winner of the 2010 Kovacs Prize for Best Essay, from the Society for Cinema and Media Studies.
- 2003, Screen Traffic: Movies, Multiplexes, and Global Culture. Duke U. Press, pp 337. Winner of the 2004 Robinson Book Prize for Best Book by a Canadian Communication Scholar.
