= Early life of Rabindranath Tagore =

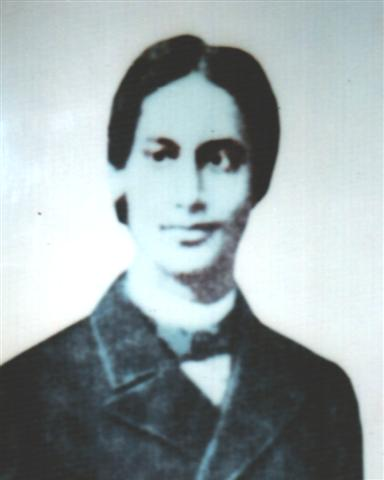
Tagore in 1879, when he was studying in England.

The first four decades in the life of Rabindranath Tagore (1861–1941) were formative of both his artistic and much of his political thinking. He was a Bengali poet, Brahmo philosopher, and scholar. His father Debendranath Tagore fought against the British soldiers.

== Family background ==
Tagore was born at No. 7 Dwarkanath Tagore Lane, Jorasanko — the address of his family mansion. In turn, Jorasanko was located in the Bengali section of north Calcutta (now Kolkata), located near Chitpur Road. The area immediately around the Jorasanko Tagore mansion was rife with poverty and prostitution. He was the son of Debendranath Tagore (1817–1905) and Sarada Devi (1830–1875). Debendranath Tagore had formulated the Brahmo faith propagated by his friend, the reformer Raja Ram Mohan Roy. Debendranath became the central figure in Brahmo society after Roy's death, who was addressed out of respect by followers as maharishi. He continued to lead the Adi Brahmo Samaj until he died. Women who married into Tagore's clan were generally from the villages of East Bengal (now Bangladesh)

== Childhood (1861–1872) ==
Tagore was born on 7 May 1861 the youngest son and ninth of thirteen children. As a child, Tagore lived amidst an atmosphere where literary magazines were published, musical recitals were held and theatre performed. The Jorasanko Tagore were indeed at the center of a large and art-loving social group. Tagore's oldest brother, Dwijendranath, was a respected philosopher and poet. Another brother, Satyendranath, was the first ethnically Indian member appointed to the elite and formerly all-white Indian Civil Service. Yet another brother, Jyotirindranath Tagore, was a talented musician, composer, and playwright. Among his sisters, Swarnakumari Devi earned fame as a novelist in her own right. Jyotirindranath's wife, Kadambari Devi — who was slightly older than Tagore — was a dear friend and a powerful influence on Tagore. Her abrupt suicide in 1884 left him distraught for years, and left a profound mark on the emotional timbre of Tagore's literary life.

For the first decade or so of his life, Tagore remained distant from his father, who was frequently away touring northern India, England, and other places. Meanwhile, Tagore was mostly confined to the family compound — he was forbidden to leave it for any purpose other than travelling to school. He thereby grew increasingly restless for the outside world, open spaces, and nature. On the other hand, Tagore was intimidated by the mansion's perceived ghostly and enigmatic aura. Further, Tagore was ordered about the house by servants in a period he would later designate as a "servocracy". Incidents included servants dunking the heads of Tagore and his siblings into drinking water held by giant clay cisterns — used as a means to quiet the children. However, since Tagore's mother only died when he was about 14, Tagore was merely conveying to his Bengali audiences the strength of the tie between the servants and the family that employed them. In addition, Tagore often refused food to satisfy servants, was confined to a chalk circle by the second-in-command servant named Shyam in parody of an analogous forest trial that Sita underwent in the Ramayana, and was told horrific stories telling the bloody exploits of outlaw dacoits.

In addition to attending school, Tagore was tutored at home by Hemendranath, his brother. His extracurricular lessons included anatomy, drawing, English language (Tagore's least favorite subject), geography, gymnastics, history, literature, mathematics, Sanskrit, science, singing, and wrestling. Meanwhile, Tagore was developing an aversion towards formal learning and schooling, stating later that the role of teaching was not to explain things, but rather to

"knock at the doors of the mind. If any boy is asked to give an account of what is awakened in him by such knocking, he will probably say something silly. For what happens within is much bigger than what comes out in words. Those who pin their faith on university examinations as the test of education take no account of this."

Tagore started writing poems around age eight, and he was urged by an older brother to recite these to people in the mansion — including to an impressed Brahmo nationalist, newspaper editor, and Hindu Mela organizer. However, Tagore also mentions that it was a teacher at his school who first took notice of and praised his skill in formal versification.

At age eleven, Tagore underwent the upanayan coming-of-age rite: he and two relatives were shaved bald and sent into retreat, where they were to chant and meditate. Tagore instead rollicked, beating drums and pulling his brothers' ears, after which he received a sacred thread of investiture. Afterward, on 14 February 1873, Tagore experienced the first close contact with his father when they set out together from Calcutta on a months-long tour of India. They first made for Shantiniketan ("Abode of Peace"), a family estate acquired in 1863 by Debendranath composed of two rooms set amidst a mango grove, trees, and plants. Tagore later recalled his stay among the rice paddies:

"What I could not see did not take me long to get over — what I did see was quite enough. There was no servant rule, and the only ring which encircled me was the blue of the horizon, drawn around these [rural] solitudes by their presiding goddess. Within this I was free to move about as I chose."

After several weeks, they traveled to Amritsar, staying near the Harmandir Sahib and worshipping at a Sikh gurudwara. They also read English- and Sanskrit-language books, exposing Tagore to astronomy, biographies of such figures as Benjamin Franklin, and Edward Gibbon's The History of the Decline and Fall of the Roman Empire. Later, in mid-April, Tagore and his father set off for the remote and frigid Himalayan hill station of Dalhousie, India, near what now is Himachal Pradesh's border with Kashmir. There, at an elevation of some 2,300 meters (7,500 feet), they lived in a house high atop Bakrota hill. Tagore was taken in by the region's deep gorges, alpine forests, and mossy streams and waterfalls. Yet Tagore was also made to study lessons — including such things as Sanskrit declensions — starting in the icy pre-dawn twilight. Tagore took a break from his readings for a noontime meal; thereafter, Tagore was to continue his studies, although he was often allowed to fall asleep. Some two months later, Tagore left his father in Dalhousie and journeyed back to Calcutta.

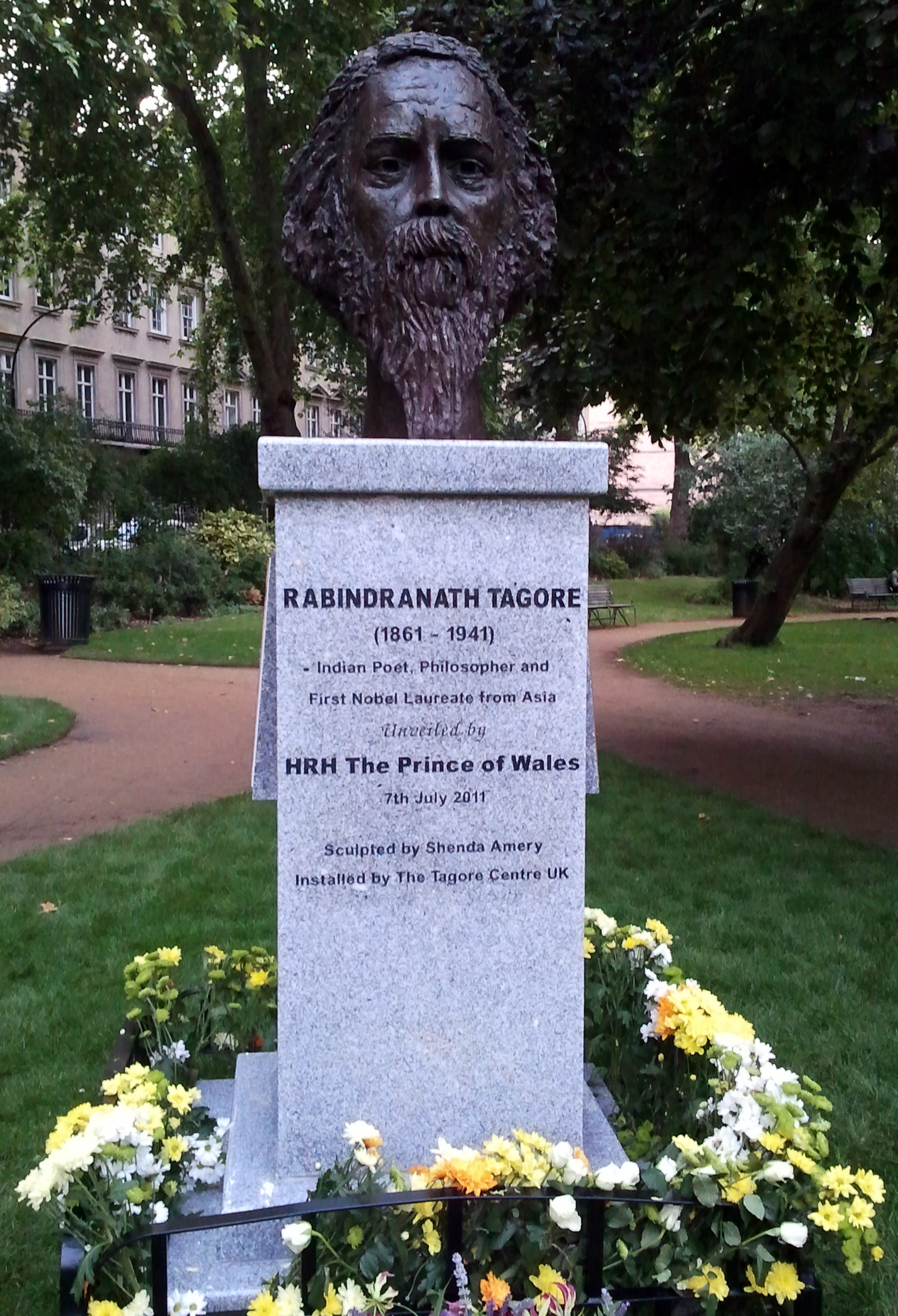
Monument to Tagore in Gordon Square next to UCL where he studied in 1879.

In early October 1878, Tagore traveled to England with the intent of becoming a barrister. He first stayed for some months at a house that the Tagore family owned near Brighton and Hove, in Medina Villas; there, he attended a Brighton school (not, as has been claimed, Brighton College — his name does not appear in its admissions register). In 1877, his nephew and niece — Suren and Indira, the children of Tagore's brother Satyendranath — were sent together with their mother (Tagore's sister-in-law) to live with him. Later, after spending Christmas of 1878 with his family, Tagore was escorted by a friend of his elder brother to London; there, Tagore's relatives hoped that he would focus more on his studies. He enrolled at University College London. However, he never completed his degree, leaving England after staying just over a year. This exposure to English culture and language would later percolate into his earlier acquaintance with Bengali musical tradition, allowing him to create new modes of music, poetry, and drama. However, Tagore neither fully embraced English strictures nor his family's traditionally strict Hindu religious observances either in his life or his art, choosing instead to pick the best from both realms of experience.

== See also ==
- Middle years of Rabindranath Tagore.
- Celebrating Tagore
