= Paira Mall =

Indian medical doctor, surgeon and medical research historian

Dr. Paira Mall M.D. (honours) Munich, M.R.C.S., L R.C.P. London (1874-1957) was an Indian-born medical doctor, linguist and collector for Henry Wellcome's Historical Medical Museum, in London.

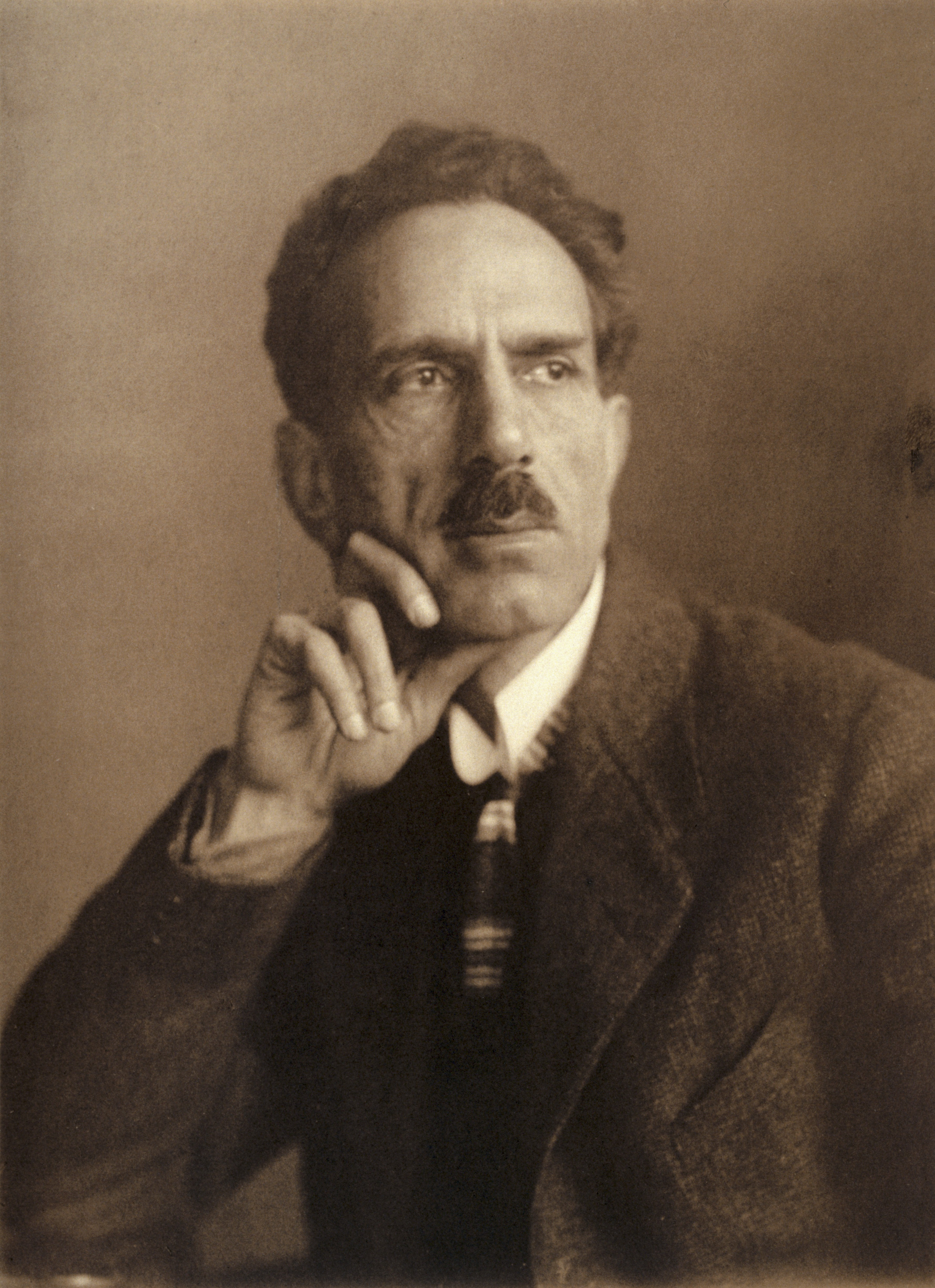
Paira Mall M.D., M.R.C.S., L R.C.P. London

== Biography ==
Born in India, Paira-Mall came from a family of jewellers. His father, Lala Buddha Mall, was a jeweller in Amritsar, India.

Paira-Mall began his higher education in London in 1897 and continued his studies at the University of Tübingen, where he focused on medicine and philosophy. In 1900, Paira-Mall received his doctorate in medicine from the medical faculty of the Ludwig-Maximilians-Universität München. His dissertation was entitled On Digestion in Birds, a Contribution to the Comparative Physiology of Digestion.

Dr. Paira-Mall practiced at the London Hospital and also served as Medical Military Attaché, 1st Japanese Army (Russo-Japanese War) 1904-1905, as an army surgeon.

He was fluent in German, French, Italian, Sanskrit, Persian, Hindi, Punjabi, Arabic, English and Japanese.

He was a founding member of the India Society, founded in London, in 1910. India Society, later the Royal India Society aimed to foster appreciation and study of Indian culture, publishing works that highlight the finest examples of Indian artistic traditions and supporting the preservation and development of traditional Indian arts and education.

In 1911, he was recruited to work for the Henry Wellcome Historical Medical Museum, in London, to collect objects from South Asia that showed the art and science of healing, and medicinal plants in Ayurvedic medicine - for use in Wellcome's chemical research labs in the UK. He also acquired local medical knowledge by copying and translating manuscripts. He collected for 15 years.

== Legacy ==
From 16 Nov 2017 to 8 April 2018, the Wellcome Collection featured items collected by Paira Mall, including medical objects, paintings, and manuscripts, in the exhibition "Ayurvedic Man: Encounters with Indian Medicine." It also included Paira Mall's written correspondence with Wellcome and his staff while Mall was traveling. According to Apollo magazine, the letters from Mall help trace "the movement of medical and cultural heritage across continents and cultures."
