= Old media =

Mass media institutions before the Digital Age

Old media, also called traditional media or legacy media, are the mass media institutions that dominated prior to the internet, particularly print media, film studios, music studios, advertising agencies, radio broadcasting, and television. Old media institutions are centralized and communicate with one-way technologies to a generally anonymous mass audience.

Old media are often contrasted with new media, which are typically computer- or smartphone-based, and are to some extent interactive and comparatively decentralized. These new media enable people to telecommunicate with one another peer-to-peer or through social media platforms, with widespread use and availability through the internet.

== Old media timeline ==
The invention of the printing press in 1440 was the start of traditional media. The creation of the Internet forever changed the world of media.

- 1440 – invention of the movable type printing press by Johannes Gutenberg. This made mass production of print media possible; this reduced the need for mouth to mouth story telling. Books were now copied exactly the same, diminishing hand written books that resulted in mistakes.
- 1664 – Gazzetta di Mantova begins publishing in Italy. As of 2024, it is the oldest newspaper in the world still publishing.
- 1810 – Friedrich Koenig, a German printer, patents the steam-powered printing press. This technology resulted in the industrialization of printed media.
- 1847 – Samuel Morse patented the electrical telegraph. This allowed people to no longer need to rely on messages by word of mouth.
- 1897 – Guglielmo Marconi patents radio. Radios were less expensive than telephones and were available to the public by the 1920s. This allowed the ability of huge numbers of people to listen to the same event at the same time. Radio was a great resource for advertisers, who could now have access to a bigger audience. In A Social History of the Media: From Gutenberg to the Internet, Asa Briggs and Peter Burke write that the early days of radio were considered "a glorious opportunity for the advertising man to spread his sales propaganda" because of "a countless audience, sympathetic, pleasure seeking, enthusiastic, curious, interested, approachable in the privacy of their homes".
- 1927 – first modern television invented by Philo Farnsworth. He was an American inventor who used an image dissector camera tube that transmitted its first image, which was a simple straight line.
- 1991 – WorldWideWeb is launched, making the internet available to the public and shifting media online.

== Old media in the United States ==
- 1940s – the US was in good standing during this time, and the television took rise for many households. About 7000 TVs were in the US during this post war time. Within 7 years, two-thirds of American household had at least one TV in their home.
- 1950s and 1960s – broadcast television was the dominant form of mass media, and the three major networks controlled more than 90 percent of the news programs, live events, and sitcoms viewed by Americans. Gross national product doubled; American homes were big contributors to the economy through media. Many households owned a television.
- 1970s – televised news became increasingly popular during the Vietnam War. It was the first war that was televised nationally as a conflict. Nightly images of war and protesters were shown on these news platforms. The three major TV networks accounted for 93 percent of all television viewing.
- 1980s and 1990s – cable television begins to spread.

== Fading of old media ==
Old media companies have diminished in the last decade with the changing media landscape, namely the modern reliance on streaming and digitization of formerly analog content, and the advent of simple worldwide connection and mass conversation. Old media, or "legacy media" conglomerates include Disney, Warner Media, ViacomCBS, Bertelsmann Publishers, and NewsCorp., owners of Fox News and Entertainment, and span from books to audio to visual media. These conglomerates are often owned and inherited between families, such as the Murdochs of NewsCorp. Due to traditional media's heavy use in economics and political structures, it remains current regardless of new media's emergence.

== Challenges faced by old media conglomerates ==
The advent of new communication technology (NCT) has brought forth a set of opportunities and challenges for conventional media. The presence of new media, and the Internet in particular, has posed a challenge to conventional media, especially the printed newspaper. The new media have also affected the way newspapers get and circulate their news. Since 1999, almost 90% of daily newspapers in the United States have been actively using online technologies to search for articles and most of them also create their own news Web sites to reach new markets.

The challenges faced by old media, especially newspapers, has to do with the combination of the global economic crisis, dwindling readership and advertising funds, and the inability of newspapers to monetize their online efforts. Newspapers, especially in the West and the United States in particular, have lost many of their classified advertisements to the Internet. Additionally, a depressed economy forced more readers to cancel their newspaper subscriptions, and business firms to cut their advertising budgets as part of their overall cost-cutting measures. As a result, closures of newspapers, bankruptcy, job cuts and salary cuts are widespread.

This has made some representatives of the United States newspaper industry seek bailouts from the government by allowing U.S. newspapers to recoup taxes they paid on profits previously to help offset some of their current losses. Accusations are being made toward search engine giants by publishers such as Sir David Bell, who categorically accused Google and Yahoo! of "stealing" the contents of newspapers. A similar allegation came from media mogul Rupert Murdoch in early April 2009, questioning if Google "should ... steal all our copyrights." Likewise, Sam Zell, owner of the Tribune Company that publishes the Chicago Tribune, the Los Angeles Times, and the Baltimore Sun claimed it was the newspapers in America who allowed Google to steal their content, and therefore credited themselves for providing Google with their content.

== Old media as a cultural construct and colloquialism ==
Old media, opposed to its newer counterpart, have been found by theorists and historians like Chris Anderson (author of The Long Tail and The Long Tail Phenomenon of Mass Communication), Marshall McLuhan, Wolfgang Ernst, and Carolyn Marvin to be inaccurate to the realities of mass communication's progression. McLuhan, specifically, argues that a medium's information is contingent upon the very medium. In so doing, it never dies and always remains current. Therefore, the binary of old and new media, with new media making old become obsolete, is inaccurate. It would be far more accurate, according to the theoretical argument of authors like Ernst, to view new and old media as a spectrum. The challenges faced by old media, therefore, will never completely remove them from the public mass media sphere. "Old media" as an idea only ever existed because "new media" does. In the research of Simone Natale, the use of the ter "old media" in a survey of books only began to become popular in the late twentieth century once the developments of new media, such as the Internet, became widely available. Natale writes of old media as a social construct because of this; because no medium is old, one compares old to new in hindsight.

== See also ==
- Decline of newspapers
- Decline of television
- History of telecommunication
- Mainstream media
- Media intelligence
- Residual media
