= Diski Dance =

The Diski Dance is a dance composed of a series of choreographed football moves, named from different parts of the country, and was created for the 2010 FIFA World Cup as part of its advertising campaign. The creator of the Diski Dance was South African choreographer Wendy Ramokgadi, who died on Friday 27 May 2011. The moves are named in Tswana, Zulu, Sotho and English amongst others and include "Tsamaya", "Heel Extension Mkhari" and "Chester". The adverts were shown on CNN, BBC, Eurosport and SkySports amongst others. The motivation of the advert was to give soccer fans "a chance to learn the moves" and "feel the rhythm of African football".

The Diski dance was featured in Matt Harding's 2010 "Where the Hell is Matt in South Africa?" video on YouTube, in preparation for the 2010 FIFA World Cup.
