= Naibedya =

Book by Rabindranath Tagore

- Author: Rabindranath Tagore
- Language: Bengali
- Genre: poetry
- Published: 1901
- Publication place: India

Naibedya (Bengali: নৈবেদ্য; English: Offerings) is a famous Bengali language poetry book by Rabindranath Tagore. It was published in 1901. It is a great creation in the "Intermediate Period" of Rabindranath's poetry. Tagore had included 15 poems of "Naibedya" in the Nobel Prize winning book Song Offerings.

== Theme ==
In Rabindranath's "Naibedya", there is a scattering of spiritual thoughts. In it he describes the spiritual greatness of Ancient India.
