= Terry Flew =

Australian media and communications scholar

Terry Flew FAHA
- Education: University of Sydney; Griffith University
- Occupations: Media and communications scholar
- Employer: University of Sydney
- Known for: New Media: An Introduction; Regulating Platforms

Terry Flew FAHA is an Australian media and communications scholar and Professor of Digital Communication and Culture at the University of Sydney. He is an Australian Research Council (ARC) Laureate Fellow and Co‑Director of the Centre for Artificial Intelligence, Trust and Governance (CAITG). His research focuses on digital media, platform governance, media policy, creative industries, and the political economy of communication. He is widely recognised for contributions to media and communications scholarship, including authorship of influential textbooks and international leadership roles.

== Early life and education ==
Flew was born on the northern beaches of Sydney, Australia. He attended Manly Primary School and Balgowlah High School (now part of the Northern Beaches Secondary College). He completed a Bachelor of Economics (Honours) and a Master of Economics at the University of Sydney. He later earned his PhD in Media and Cultural Studies from Griffith University, where his thesis examined Australian broadcast media regulation.

== Academic career ==
Flew began his academic career in 1990 as a lecturer at the University of Technology Sydney. In 1994 he joined the Queensland University of Technology (QUT), where he later became Senior Lecturer, Associate Professor, and ultimately Professor of Media and Communications within the Creative Industries Faculty. He held multiple leadership roles at QUT, including Head of Postgraduate Study and Assistant Dean (Research).

In 2021, Flew joined the University of Sydney as Professor of Digital Communication and Culture. He served as Deputy Head of School (Research) in 2022–2023 and became Co‑Director of the Centre for Artificial Intelligence, Trust and Governance (CAITG) in 2025.

In 2026, he was appointed a Visiting Senior Fellow at the London School of Economics and Political Science (LSE). His previous international appointments include visiting roles at George Washington University, City University London, Communications University of China, and the University of Nottingham Ningbo China.

== Research contributions ==
Flew’s research includes work in digital media, platform governance, media policy, trust and mistrust in news, creative industries, and global media transformations. He has published extensively in journals such as Media, Culture & Society, Journal of Communication, International Journal of Communication, Global Media and China, and Policy & Internet.

He is the author or editor of more than 17 books, including:

- Valuing News: Digital Platforms and Journalism Futures
- Regulating Platforms
- The SAGE Handbook of the Digital Media Economy
- Understanding Global Media
- Digital Platform Regulation: Global Perspectives
- Media Economics
- Global Creative Industries

His scholarship has been translated into multiple languages, including Chinese, Arabic, Hebrew, Polish, Turkish and Persian.

He has worked with corporate and government partners including the Special Broadcasting Service, Australian Communications and Media Authority, Department of Communications and the Arts, UK Department for Science, Innovation and Technology, Meta, Roblox, Fairfax Media, Cisco Systems Australia, NSW Department of Creative Industries, Tourism, Hospitality and Sports, Telstra, Arts Queensland and Smart Internet Lab.

He has advised the OECD on the future of news, and the NSW Department of Education on AI in schools.

In 2011–12, he was Lead Commissioner of the Australian Law Reform Commission heading the National Classification Scheme Review.

== Leadership and professional service ==
He served as President of the International Communication Association (ICA from 2019 to 2020 and sat on the ICA Executive from 2017 to 2023. He was also President of the Australian and New Zealand Communication Association (AANZCA) in 2009–2010.

He is the founding editor of Communication Research and Practice, an academic journal supported by ANZCA.

In 2019, Flew was elected a Fellow of the Australian Academy of the Humanities.

== Grants and fellowships ==
Flew has participated in research projects generating approximately $11 million in competitive research income, including more than $9.9 million in Category 1 ARC funding. His projects include ARC Discovery grants on news value, platform governance, trust in news, and creative industries, as well as Linkage grants on crisis communication, citizen journalism, and digital media for youth.

He commenced an ARC Laureate Fellowship (2024–2029) for the project Mediated Trust: Ideas, Interests, Institutions, Futures.

He received a Bicentennial Fellowship from the Menzies Centre for Australian Studies in 2019.

== Podcasting ==
Flew is the host of the podcast Time for Trust produced as part of his ARC Laureate program. The show features discussions with experts on trust, public communication, technology, and democracy.

== Selected works ==
New Media: An Introduction (2002, 2005, 2008, 2014)

Global Creative Industries (2013)

Media Economics (2015)

Understanding Global Media (2018)

Regulating Platforms (2021)

SAGE Handbook of the Digital Media Economy

Valuing News: Digital Platforms and Journalism Futures
