= Excorporation =

Excorporation is the process through which mass cultural commodities are changed or remade into one’s own culture. The theory of Excorporation was popularized by sociologist John Fiske, in order to explain the ongoing struggle between the dominant and subordinate groups in popular culture.

== Definition ==
The term excorporation was highlighted by sociologist John Fiske in his 1989 book, Understanding Popular Culture. Fiske states that excorporation is “the process by which the subordinate make their own culture out of the resources and commodities provided by the dominant system”. Fiske believes this idea to be central to the study of popular culture. He argues that in an industrialized world, the subordinated group has only the use of resources supplied to them by the dominant group from which to create their own subcultures and social commodities. In his theory, Fiske refutes the idea of folk culture, any sort of ‘authentic’ culture, saying that it does not exist in such a society. In other words, the subordinate deals with what is available. This requires the study of popular culture to not only look at the various cultural commodities, but the ways in which the individual uses them as well. Fiske sees the different uses of commodities to be most interesting. The excorporation of resources is generally more varied and creative than the original.

Fiske states that the subordinate’s ability to create originality and thus oppose the dominant “results in the producers having to resort to the processes of incorporation or containment”. By reincorporating the differences made by excorporation, the dominant group strips the subordinate group from any opposition that the latter may have created. This ensures the stability of the dominant system.

== Criticism ==
Several sociological authors have criticized Fiske's theory of excorporation, primarily for its overarching simplicity and its unfocused basis.

Deborah Cook, in her 1992 article "Ruses de Guerre: Baudrillard and Fiske on Media Reception" argues that excorporation is not necessarily a political or even meaningful activity, as Fiske claims. Under Fiske’s theory, the process of excorporating creates meaning, be it as simple as personalizing a commercial commodity. However, Cook argues that Fiske attempts "to locate resistance in a set of largely unconscious, unfocused, and apolitical activities...Fiske's analyses are undisciplined by any interpretive methods," therefore implying that not every act of excorporation necessarily contains meaning.

Ray Browne, of Bowling Green University, agrees with Cook's assertion, explaining that Fiske "looks upon popular culture as a portion of the life actions and fluids which constitute all of society, and in so doing, Fiske seems to limit the totality of culture, or to misunderstand it."

== Examples in Modern Society ==
Blue denim jeans have become a product of excorporation. Levi Strauss was the founder of the garment. Strauss was a German Immigrant who immigrated to San Francisco during the California Gold Rush in 1853. He coined the blue denim jean due to a need from prospectors in the area for strong work pants in the mines. The material was used because it did not cause chafing, unlike the typical canvas pants that were worn during the time by workers.

Through the decades of the past century, the cultural meaning of blue jeans has changed. For example, the 1930s were the times of western films, propelling the character of the American cowboy and their Wrangler jeans into the public limelight. The 1940s resulted in jeans being introduced to the world based on the start of globalization and World War II. In the 1950s, denim became a popular garment that symbolized rebellion, such as in James Dean’s movie Rebel Without a Cause. During this time, some public schools in the United States banned students from wearing blue jeans.

The 1960s and the 1970s were the start of crafting jeans for individual taste, based on the fashion and social movements at the time. Examples of these include embroidered jeans, painted jeans, and psychedelic jeans. John Fiske describes this as “the raggedness is the production of the choice of the user; it is an excorporation of the commodity into a subordinates subculture and a transfer of at least some of the power inherent in the commoditization process.” In the 1980s jeans became designer fashion, labels such as Guess jeans. More recently, the focus on personalization of jeans includes finish, styles, cuts, shapes, aged, authentic, and vintage jeans. John Fiske is quoted as saying “the wearer of torn jeans is, after all, wearing jeans and not, for instance the Buddhist derived robes of the orange people."
