= Matt Harding =

American traveler, video game designer, and internet celebrity (born 1976)

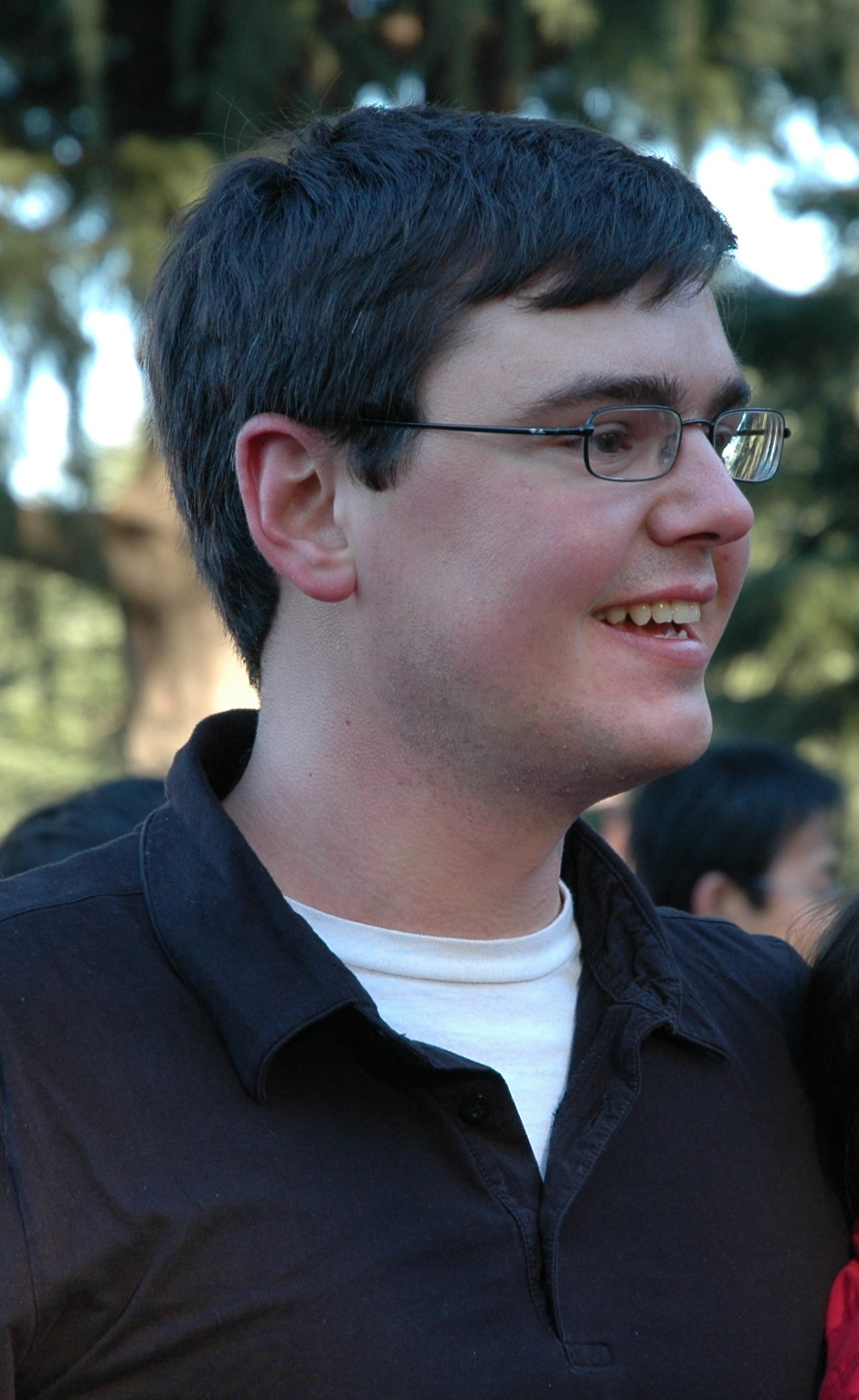
- Harding in 2007
- Born: Matthew Harding; September 27, 1976 (age 50); Norwalk, Connecticut
- Website: www.wheretheheckismatt.com

Matthew Harding (born September 27, 1976) is an American traveler, video game designer, and Internet celebrity who is known as Dancing Matt, for his viral videos that show him dancing in front of landmarks and street scenes in various international locations. Harding has since received widespread coverage of his travel exploits in major print and broadcast media outlets, and was hired by Visa to star in their Travel Happy campaign in 2008.

He is originally from Westport, Connecticut.

== Video game developer ==
He began his game industry career working for a video game specialty store called Cutting Edge Entertainment. Harding later worked as an editor for GameWeek Magazine in Wilton, Connecticut, and then as a software developer for Activision in Santa Monica, California and then Brisbane, Queensland.

Harding claims that a sarcastic joke about the popularity of shoot 'em up games led Pandemic Studios to develop the game Destroy All Humans!, on which he received a conceptual credit. He said, "...didn't want to spend two years of my life writing a game about killing everyone...". He quit his job and began traveling, leading to the production of his first video, which was uploaded to YouTube in July 2006.

== Where the Hell is Matt? videos ==
Where the Hell is Matt? is an Internet phenomenon that features a video of Matt, aka Dancing Matt, doing a dance "jig" in many different places around the world in 2005–2006. The background music in the video is the song "Sweet Lullaby Dancing Remix" by Deep Forest. The video garnered popularity on the video sharing site YouTube. There are now five major videos plus outtakes and background videos on YouTube.

The titles in the five major videos are all titled Dancing without the year in the videos; Harding labels them as Where the Hell is Matt? (year) on YouTube. The 2012 YouTube titles have also been titled Happy People Dancing on Planet Earth as well as Happy New Year! Peace on Earth in 2013.

- Dancing 2005: filmed from 2003 to 2004 (15 countries and 4 US states)
- Dancing 2006: filmed from 2005 to 2006 (28 countries, Antarctica, 6 US states, and 1 US territory Guam)
- Dancing 2008: filmed from 2007 to 2008 (42 countries, 8 US states and the District of Columbia, and 3 Canadian provinces)
- Dancing 2010: filmed in 2010 (note this was filmed exclusively in South Africa to promote the 2010 World Cup)
- Dancing 2012: filmed from 2011 to 2012 (40 countries, 13 US states and Puerto Rico, and 1 Canadian province)
- Dancing 2016: (15 countries, 12 US states and the District of Columbia, and 2 Canadian provinces)

However, some of these locations are repeated in different videos, such as San Francisco, New York City, or Papua New Guinea. Therefore, as of the filming of Dancing 2016, Matt had visited approximately 99 countries, 21 states, Washington, DC, Guam, Puerto Rico, 4 Canadian provinces, and Antarctica.

In 2007, Jawed Karim, one of the founders of YouTube, stated that Harding's video was his favorite on YouTube at that time.

In November 2008, Matt and the vocalist Palbasha were interviewed by KFAI radio in Minnesota. The interview focused on how the "Dance 2008" project came to include Palbasha.

== Ludography ==
Harding's development credits include:

- Zork: Grand Inquisitor (1997)
- Battlezone (1998)
- Battlezone II: Combat Commander (1999)
- Dark Reign 2 (2000)
- Army Men: RTS (2002)
- Lemony Snicket's A Series of Unfortunate Events (2004)
- Destroy All Humans! (2005)
- Pirates of the Caribbean: The Legend of Jack Sparrow (2006)
