= Gitanjali =

Collection of poems by Rabindranath Tagore

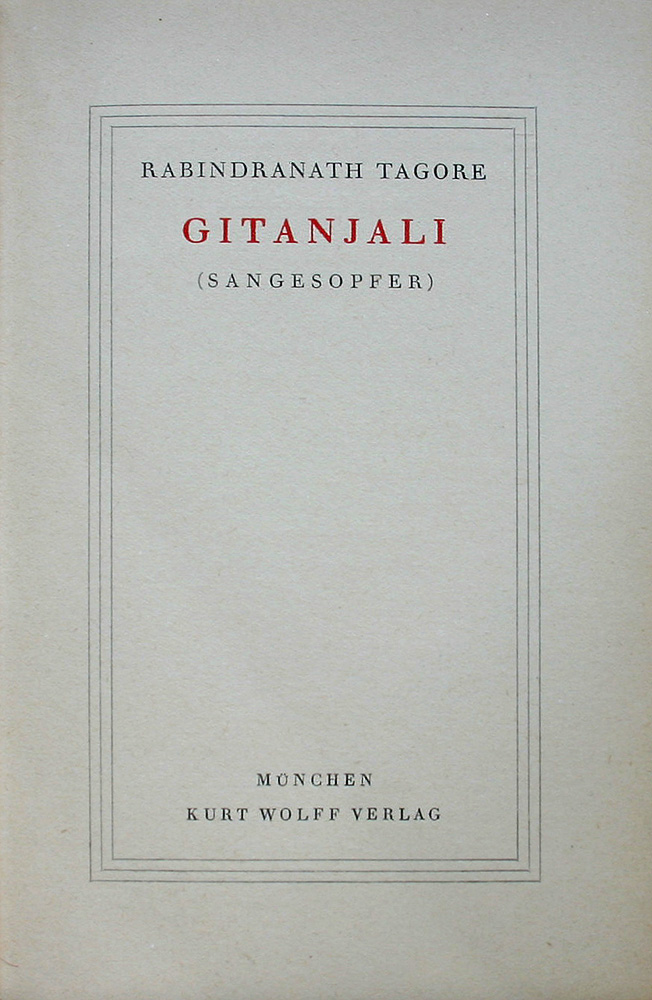
- Title page
- Author: Rabindranath Tagore
- Original title: গীতাঞ্জলি
- Language: Bengali
- Subject: Devotion to God
- Genre: Poem
- Publication date: 4 August 1910; 116 years ago
- Publication place: British India
- English publication date: 1912; 114 years ago
- Pages: 104
- Text: Gitanjali at Wikisource

Gitanjali (Bengali: গীতাঞ্জলি, lit. ''Song offering'') is a collection of poems by the Bengali poet Rabindranath Tagore. Tagore received the Nobel Prize for Literature in 1913, for its English translation, Song Offerings, making him the first non-European and the first Asian and the only Indian to receive this honour.

It is part of the UNESCO Collection of Representative Works. Its central theme is devotion, and its motto is "I am here to sing thee songs" (Song No. XV).

== History ==
The collection by Tagore, originally written in Bengali, comprises 157 poems, many of which have been turned into songs or Rabindra Sangeet. The original Bengali collection was published on 4 August 1910. The translated version, Gitanjali: Song Offerings, was published in November 1912 by the India Society of London. It contained translations of 53 poems from the original Gitanjali, as well as 50 other poems extracted from Tagore's Achalayatan, Gitimalya, Naibedya, Kheya, and more. Overall, Gitanjali: Song Offerings consists of 103 prose poems of Tagore's own English translations. The poems were based on medieval Indian lyrics of devotion with a common theme of love across most poems. Some poems also narrated a conflict between the desire for materialistic possessions and spiritual longing.

== Reworking in other languages ==
The English version of Gitanjali or Song Offerings/Singing Angel is a collection of 103 English prose poems, which are Tagore's own English translations of his Bengali poems, first published in November 1912 by the India Society in London. It contained translations of 53 poems from the original Bengali Gitanjali, as well as 50 other poems from his other works. The translations were often radical, leaving out or altering large chunks of the poem and in one instance fusing two separate poems (song 95, which unifies songs 89 and 90 of Naivedya). The English Gitanjali became popular in the West, and was widely translated.

== See also ==
- Stream of Life, the Gitanjali poem no. 69, reworked by composer Garry Schyman as lyrics for the song "Praan"
