= Royal India Society =

Organization in the United Kingdom

The Royal India Society was a 20th-century British learned society concerned with British India.

The Society has had several names:

- The India Society (founded 1910);
- The Royal India Society (from 1944);
- The Royal India and Pakistan Society (after the Partition of India in 1947);
- The Royal India, Pakistan and Ceylon Society (after 1948);
- Finally it was merged with the East India Association in 1966.

== India Society ==
The India Society was founded in 1910. The earliest members were T. W. Rolleston (Honorary Secretary), T. W. Arnold, Leighton Cleather, A. K. Coomaraswamy, Walter Crane, E. B. Havell, Christiana Herringham, Paira Mall, and William Rothenstein.

"In 1910 he [Coomaraswamy] became involved in a very public controversy, played out in the correspondence columns of The Times and elsewhere, on the status of Indian art. This had started when Sir George Birdwood, while chairing the Indian Section of the annual meeting of the Royal Society of Arts, had announced that there was no "fine art" in India and had somewhat unwisely responded to the suggestion that a particular statue of the Buddha was an example of fine art: "This senseless similitude, in its immemorial fixed pose, is nothing more than an uninspired brazen image. . . . A boiled suet pudding would serve equally well as a symbol of passionless purity and serenity of soul. This controversy culminated in the, foundation of the India Society, later the Royal India Society, to combat the views of the Birdwoods of this world." (Mark Sedgwick 2004)

The Society's aims and plans were described in The Times, 11 June 1910 as follows:
"The society desires to promote the study and appreciations of Indian culture in its aesthetic aspects, believing that in Indian sculpture, architecture, and painting, as well as in Indian literature and music, there is a vast unexplored field, the investigation of which will bring about a better understanding of Indian India. Everything will be done to promote the acquisition by the authorities of our national and provincial museums of works representing the best Indian art. The society proposes to publish works showing the best examples of Indian architecture, sculpture, and painting, and hopes to co-operate with all those who have it as their aim to keep alive the traditional arts and handicrafts still existing in India, and to assist in the development of Indian art education on native and traditional lines, and not in imitation of European ideals."

The India Society organised a conference on Indian Art at the British Empire Exhibition, at Wembley, on 2 June 1924.

=== Publications of the India Society ===
The Society's publications included:

- Indian Art and Letters - twice-yearly journal, issued from 1925
- Indian drawings, ed. A. K. Coomaraswamy (1910)
- Examples of Indian sculpture at the British Museum: twelve collotype plates (1910)
- Indian drawings II, ed. A. K. Coomaraswamy (1911-12)
- Eleven Plates. Representing Works of Indian Sculptures Chiefly in English Collections, ed. E. B. Havell (1911)
- Kapilar and a Tamil Saint, by A. K. Coomaraswamy (1911)
- Gitanjali ('Song-offering'), by Rabindranath Tagore (1912)
- Chitra, by Rabindranath Tagore (1913)
- One hundred poems of Kabir, tr. by Rabindranath Tagore and Evelyn Underhill (1914)
- The Music of Hindostan, by A. H. Fox Strangways (1914)
- Ajanta Frescoes: being reproductions in colour and monochrome of frescoes in some of the caves at Ajanta, after copies taken ... 1909-1911, by Christiana Herringham and her assistants (1915)
- The Mirror of Gesture by A. K. Coomaraswamy (1916)
- Handbook of Indian Art, by E. B. Havell (1920)
- Indian Art at the British Empire Exhibition, with introduction by Lionel Heath (1924)
- The Architectural Antiquities of Western India, by Henry Cousens (ASI) (1926)
- The Bagh Caves in the Gwalior State, by John Marshall, M. B. Garde, J. Ph. Vogel, E. B. Havell, and James Cousins (1927)
- The Brothers, by Taraknath Ganguli, tr. by Edward Thompson (1928)
- Ancient Monuments of Kashmir, by Ram Chandra Kak (1933)
- The Red Tortoise and Other Tales of Rural India, by N. Gangulee (1940)
- A Garland of Indian Poetry, ed. by H. G. Rawlinson (1946)
- The Tulip of Sinai, by Muhammad Iqbal, tr. A. J. Arberry (1947)
- Indian Art and Letters (1947)
- a book on Mughal Painting, edited by T. W. Arnold and Laurence Binyon

== Royal India Society ==
In 1944 the Society was granted permission to become the Royal India Society under the patronage of the Dowager Queen Mary of Teck.

== Subsequent names ==
After partition, its name was again changed to the Royal India and Pakistan Society, and then again to the Royal India, Pakistan and Ceylon Society. In 1966 it merged with the East India Association.
