= Pratap =

Prathap or Pratap is a name used in India as a man's given name, or as a surname.

== Notable people ==
- Prathap (Kannada actor), Indian film actor
- Prithvik Pratap, an Indian actor and comedian
- Maharana Pratap Singh (1540–1597), Indian Rajput ruler of Mewar
- Sai Prathap Annayyagari (b. 1944), Indian National Congress politician
- Vidhu Prathap (b. 1980), Indian singer
- Pratap Singh – for a list of people with that name

== Media ==
- Prathap (1990 film), a 1990 Kannada-language film starring Arjun
- Pratap (1993 film), a 1993 Tamil-language film directed and starring Arjun
- Pratap (2026 film), a 2026 Hindi-language action drama film directed by Sachin Saraf and starring Amit Sadh and Esha Deol

== Other ==
- Pho Prathap Chang District - district in Phichit province, Thailand
- Prathapa Mudaliar Charithram - 1879 Tamil novel by M. V. Pillai
- Veera Prathap, Telugu-language title of the Tamil film Uthama Puthiran (1958 film)
