= Amit Sadh =

Indian film actor (born 1979)

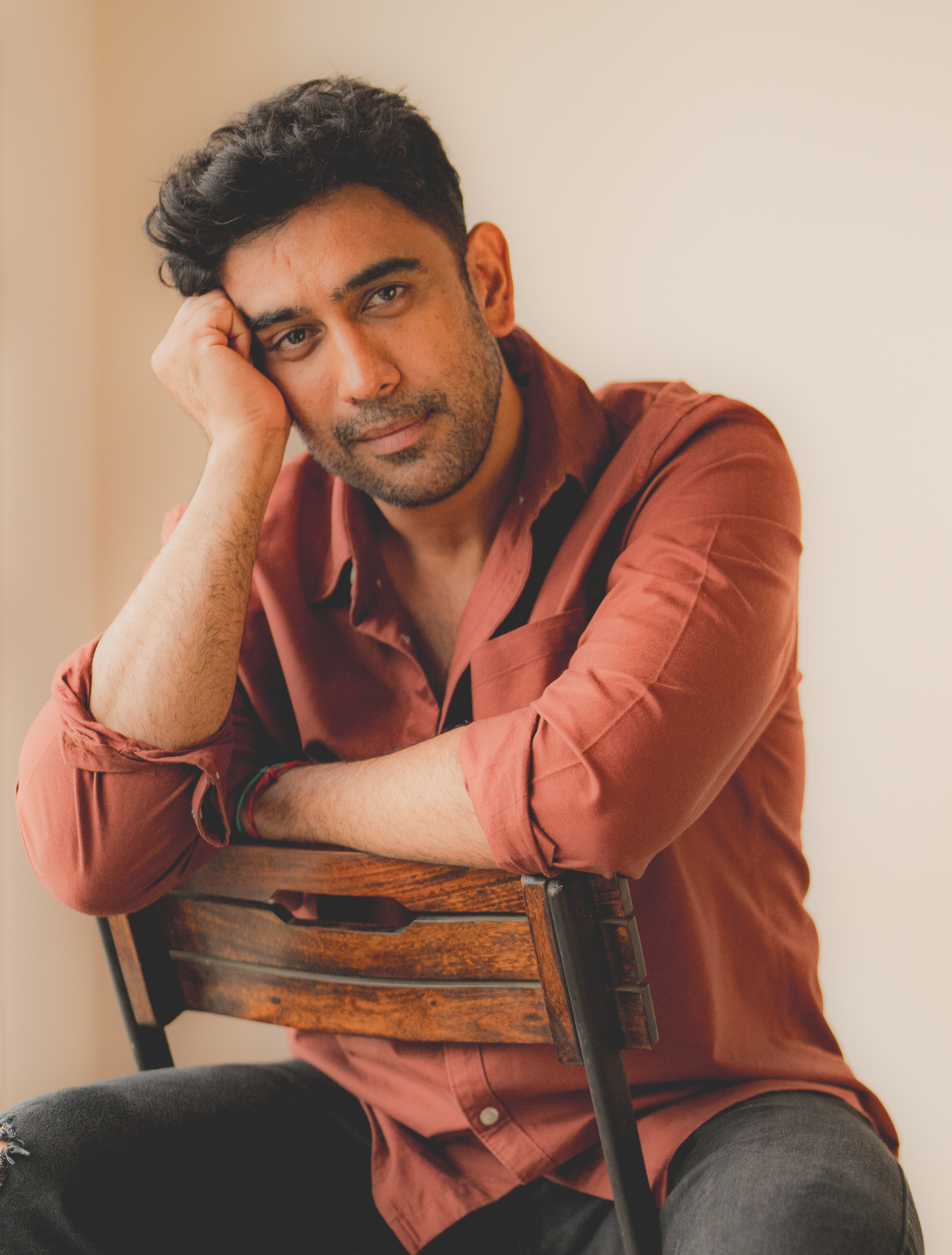
- Sadh in 2018
- Born: 5 June 1979 (age 47); Delhi, India
- Occupation: Actor
- Years active: 2002–present

Amit Sadh (born 5 June 1979) is an Indian actor who is known for his work in several films and television productions. He is best known for his performances in films like Kai Po Che! (2013), Sultan (2016) and Gold (2018). In recent years, he has become well-known for his roles in web series. He played Inspector Kabir Sawant in three seasons of Breathe (2018, 2020, 2022) streaming on Amazon Prime Video. He won the Filmfare OTT Award for Best Supporting Actor in a Drama Series.

He began his acting career with the teen drama Kyun Hota Hai Pyarrr and later appeared in the reality shows Nach Baliye 1 and Bigg Boss 1. He played the role of Kshitij in Shobna Desai's soap opera Durgesh Nandinii that aired on Sony Entertainment Television.

In Avrodh: The Siege Within, he played an important role in a military drama about the 2016 Uri attack. Jeet Ki Zid is a series based on the life of Major Deependra Singh Sengar, an army officer.

== Early life ==
Sadh was born on 5 June 1979 in Delhi. He completed his graduation from La Martiniere College, Lucknow. Sadh's father Ram Chandra Dogra, was a national-level hockey player. Sadh lost his father when he was only 16 years old.

His family home is in Punjab. At the age of 21, he left home and moved to Mumbai to become an actor.

== Career ==
=== Television career (2002–2008) ===
Sadh's first major role was in Neena Gupta's production Kyun Hota Hai Pyarrr, where he portrayed the character of Aditya. He then starred in the series Kohinoor. He appeared as a contestant on the reality show Bigg Boss. Sadh participated in the original seasons of Nach Baliye and Fear Factor.

=== Film career (2010–present) ===
Sadh has played important supporting roles in several movies and web series. In 2013, He worked in Kai Po Che! playing the role of a priest's son alongside Amrita Puri, Sushant Singh Rajput and Rajkummar Rao. After in 2015, He appeared in a Comedy Flim Guddu Rangeela, alongside Arshad Warsi and Aditi Rao Hydari. In Sultan (2016), he played the role of a businessman alongside Salman Khan and Anushka Sharma. In 2017, He appeared in Sarkar 3 alongside Amitabh Bachchan. in the same year, he appeared in a Romantic Comedy Film Running Shaadi, alongside Taapsee Pannu. In 2018, Sadh worked in the next film Jack and Dil alongside Arbaaz Khan, Sonal Chauhan and Evelyn Sharma. In the same year, He appeared in Gold as Raghubir Pratap Singh, based on the real life character of K. D. Singh Babu alongside Akshay Kumar. In 2019, Sadh appeared in Barot House alongside Manjari Fadnis and Aaryan Menghji. In 2020, he played the role of Shakuntala Devi's son-in-law alongside Vidya Balan and Sanya Malhotra in Shakuntala Devi. In the same year, Sadh appeared in Operation Parindey (A '1 hour film') alongside Rahul Dev. Again in the same year, his next film was Yaara alongside Vidyut Jammwal, Vijay Varma and Shruthi Hassan. In 2023, Sadh appeared in Sukhee alongside Shilpa Shetty and Kusha Kapila.

In 2018, he featured as Inspector Kabir Sawant in the web series Breathe alongside R. Madhavan, and reprised his role in Breathe: Into the Shadows along with Abhishek Bachchan and Nithya Menen in 2020. In the same year, he played the role of Major Videep Singh in Avrodh: The Siege Within which was a fictionalised retelling of the 2016 Uri attack and the following surgical strikes, along with Darshan Kumaar and Madhurima Tuli. In 2021, He donned the role of retired Indian Army special forces officer Major Deependra Singh Sengar in Jeet Ki Zid alongside Sushant Singh and reunited with Amrita Puri (after Kai Po Che!). In 2022, He Reunited for Breathe: Into the Shadows Season 2 as the role of Kabir Sawant. In the same year, He appeared in Duranga (It is a remake of South Korean drama Flower of Evil) alongside Gulshan Devaiah and Drashti Dhami. In 2023, he reunited for Duranga Season 2 as the role of Sammit Patel.

In 2018, he made his short film debut Baarish Mein Chowmein alongside Taapsee Pannu. In 2023, he appeared in Ghuspaith Between Borders alongside Pamela Bhutoria.

== Filmography ==
=== Films ===
Year	Title	Role	Notes	Ref.
2010	Phoonk 2	Ronnie		
2012	Maximum			
2013	Kai Po Che!	Omi Shastri		
2015	Guddu Rangeela	Guddu		
2016	Sultan	Aakash Oberoi		
2016	Akira	Sidharth		
2017	Running Shaadi	Ram Bharose		
2017	Sarkar 3	Shivaji Nagre		
2017	Raag Desh	Gurbaksh Singh Dhillon		
2018	Baarish Aur Chowmein	Siraj	Short film	
2018	Gold	Raghubir Pratap Singh		
2018	Jack and Dil	Jack		
2019	Super 30	Raghunath		
2019	Barot House	Amit Barot		
2020	Operation Parindey	Abhinav Mathur		
2020	Yaara	Mohammad "Mitwa" Shehriya		
2020	Shakuntala Devi	Ajay Abhaya Kumar		
2023	Sukhee	Vikram Verma		
2023	Ghuspaith	Manav	Short film	
2025	Pune Highway	Khandu		
2026	Pratap	Pratap		

=== Television ===
Year	Title	Role	Notes
2002–2003	Kyun Hota Hai Pyarrr	Aditya Bhargav	
2003	Kya Hadsaa Kya Haqeeqat	Rohan	
2003–2004	Awaz - Dil Se Dil Tak	Bhaskar	
2004	Kkoi Dil Mein Hai	Arjun Punj	
2004	Miss India	Sahil	
2004	Saaksshi	Deepak	
2004–2005	Guns & Roses	Parshuram Bardez	
2005	Kohinoor	Karan Saxena	
2005	Nach Baliye 1	Contestant	7th place
2006–2007	Bigg Boss 1	Contestant	5th place
2007	Fear Factor India	Contestant	
2024	MTV Dark Scroll	Host	

=== Web series ===
Year	Title	Role	Ref.
2018	Breathe	Kabir Sawant	
2020–2022	Breathe: Into the Shadows	Kabir Sawant	
2020	Avrodh: The Siege Within	Major Videep Singh	
2021	Jeet Ki Zid	Deependra Singh Sengar	
2021	Saat Kadam	Ravi Pal	
2022-2023	Duranga	Sammit Patel	

== Awards and nominations ==
Year	Award	Category	Work	Result	Ref(s)
2020	Filmfare OTT Awards	Best Supporting Actor (Male) (Drama Series)	Breathe: Into the Shadows	Won	
2022	Indian Television Academy Awards	Popular Actor - Web	Avrodh: The Siege Within	Nominated	
2022	Indian Television Academy Awards	Popular Actor - Web	Jeet Ki Zid	Nominated	
2022	Indian Television Academy Awards	Popular Actor - Web	7 Kadam	Nominated	
