= Jubilee (soundtrack) =

2023 soundtrack albums

The music for the 2023 period drama television series Jubilee co-created and directed by Vikramaditya Motwane for Amazon Prime Video, features an original soundtrack of 12 songs composed by Amit Trivedi with lyrics written by Kausar Munir, and an original score composed by Alokananda Dasgupta. Both Trivedi and Dasgupta had collaborated with Motwane on their projects. The soundtrack album was released on 24 March 2023, two weeks before the series' premiere while the score album was released on 10 May. Both the albums were marketed by T-Series.

== Original soundtrack ==
Jubilee

Soundtrack album by Amit Trivedi
- Released: 24 March 2023
- Recorded: 2022–2023
- Genre: Television soundtrack
- Length: 50:07
- Language: Hindi
- Label: T-Series

Amit Trivedi chronology
Mrs. Chatterjee vs Norway (2023)	Jubilee (2023)	Ghoomer (2023)

=== Development ===
Motwane's norm collaborator Amit Trivedi composed the soundtrack for Jubilee, who considered it as his career's biggest album having 12 songs. Kausar Munir was enlisted to write the lyrics for all the songs, which was exciting for him as he liked the retro space and the script being finalized even before production helped him to brainstorm the ideas of possible lyrics.

The music sessions happened with Goa, with Trivedi, Motwane and Munir, and also director Anvita Dutt and Swanand Kirkire being present; Trivedi also worked on the Netflix film Qala (2022) at the same time, both the series and the film were set during the 1940s and 1950s period. To create the soundscape for both albums, Trivedi had to be transported to the era "in every possible way", by doing yoga and listening to the era's songs. He also indluged in Sattvic diet to focus on creating Jubilee's soundtrack. Despite the setting of both Qala and Jubilee were in the same era, both albums carried different sensibilities owing to Dutt and Motwane's directorial treatment, but the world they were set remained consistent and so does the sonic palette. Although Qala being "character driven", Jubilee was more period driven as it discusses about the golden age of the film industry.

Kausar had been an admirer of Hindi film music from the 1950s and hence he did not need to research or understands about ghazals or the structures of a ballad, and went ahead with the flow of the melody and the script. But also ensure it to make it contemporary and appealing to the current generation audiences. Several popular songs served as reference points for creating the songs, with "Saare Ke Saare Akele" a hat tip to "Dekhi Zamaane Ki Yaari" from Kaagaz Ke Phool (1959), "Babuji Bhole Bhaale" being a reference to the club song "Babuji Dheere Chalna" from Aar Paar (1958) and "Dariyacha Raja" being a reference to "Ramaiya Vastavaiya" from Shree 420 (1955).

The entire soundtrack was recorded live to envision the ambience of that period, and all the actors were lip synced to the songs, though Sunidhi Chauhan, Papon, Mohammed Irfan and Shahid Mallya being the playback singers. The male vocalists were instructed to sing in the style of K. L. Saigal and Mukesh, and the female vocalists had other reference points for singers such as Geeta Dutt. Trivedi said that Motwane had provided him full freedom to work on the musical style, hence much of the compositions had remained unchanged.

=== Track listing ===
All lyrics are written by Kausar Munir.

No.	Title	Singer(s)	Length
1.	"Babuji Bhole Bhaale"	Sunidhi Chauhan	4:05
2.	"Dil Jahan Pe Le Chala"	Amit Trivedi	3:53
3.	"Nahin Ji Nahin"	Papon, Sunidhi Chauhan	3:38
4.	"Vo Tere Mere Ishq Ka"	Sunidhi Chauhan	5:13
5.	"Na Koyi Mera"	Papon, Vaishali Mhade	3:56
6.	"Chandu Naacha"	Swanand Kirkire, Amit Trivedi	4:01
7.	"Udankhatole"	Mohammed Irfan, Vaishali Mhade	4:13
8.	"Dariyacha Raja"	Mohammed Irfan, Divya Kumar	4:04
9.	"Itni Si Hai Dastaan"	Mohammed Irfan, Sunidhi Chauhan	2:55
10.	"Dil Jahan Pe Le Chala (Reprise)"	Shahid Mallya	3:53
11.	"Itraati Chali"	Mohammed Irfan, Vaishali Mhade	3:09
12.	"Saare Ke Saare Akele"	Devender Pal Singh	7:04
Total length:			50:07

=== Reception ===
Calling the songs "extremely enjoyable and accessible", Vipin Nair of Music Aloud stated that Jubilee cemented Trivedi's reputation on delivering successful retro-flavored soundtracks and the composer had managed "to produce a wonderful tribute to some of the giants of yesteryear Hindi film music, almost entirely eschewing his personal brand in favour of that authenticity". Narendra Kusnur of The Free Press Journal added that the soundtrack was "well-orchestrated" having "its own personality and colour" and considered it a tribute to S. D. Burman, Shankar–Jaikishan, C. Ramchandra, Hridaynath Mangeshkar and O. P. Nayyar.

Saibal Chatterjee of NDTV called the soundtrack a "stunningly original array of sounds" where the "compositions accentuate the distinctive tenor of the series [ranging] from the peppy to the romantic, from the melodic to the elegiac". Sukanya Verma of Rediff.com wrote "having delivered one of his career-best soundtracks around the jazz-heavy milieu in Anurag Kashyap's Bombay Velvet, Amit Trivedi has no trouble shipping us back in time again in Jubilee" where each song "traces back to melodious nostalgia from the 1950s".

Shomini Sen of WION wrote "The series also has a terrific soundtrack courtesy Amit Trivedi who beautifully defines music of that era perfectly." Vinamra Mathur of Firstpost stated "[Trivedi's] musical pieces always succeed in echoing [Motwane's] vision as a filmmaker". Calling the music as one of its strengths, Abhimanyu Mathur of Daily News and Analysis added "If Qala had melancholy at its core, Jubilee has gaiety". Ronak Kotecha of The Times of India wrote "The music compositions aren’t exactly chartbursting but they lend a perfect note to the ups and downs in tinsel town when the country is going through its most crucial phase".

=== Accolades ===
Award	Date of ceremony	Category	Nominee	Result	Ref.
Filmfare OTT Awards	26 November 2023	Best Original Soundtrack (Series)	Amit Trivedi	Won	

== Original score ==
Jubilee

Film score by Alokananda Dasgupta
- Released: 10 May 2023
- Recorded: 2022–2023
- Genre: Television score
- Length: 48:32
- Language: Hindi
- Label: T-Series

Alokananda Dasgupta chronology
Kicking Balls (2022)	Jubilee (2023)	The Jengaburu Curse (2023)

=== Development ===
Alokananda Dasgupta was in charge of creating the original score, having previously associated with Motwane in Trapped (2016), Sacred Games (2018–2019) and AK vs AK (2020). Motwane asked Dasgupta to watch the opening credits of the 1950s Hindi films to provide insight about the soundscape that they were looking for. Hence, she composed an overture that uses brass, strings, horns, whistle and clarinets that used as a title piece "Fanfare". Though brass instruments were originally utilized for the piece, the use of whistle came from a childhood memory as she watched the Akira Kurosawa's anthology Dreams (1990), when she was a piano student and the use of whistle of a steam engine fused with Frédéric Chopin's "Prelude, Op. 28, No. 15" had stayed in her mind, adding that it "signifies the journey, the pain, the Partition".

The remaining score utilizes on the classic melodies without modern instrumentation. Dasgupta recalled that Motwane wanted a timeless score that does not imitate the 1940s and 1950s or feel caricaturish. She was further influenced by Satyajit Ray's use of music in his films, and elaborately utilized flute, clarinet and strings in certain sequences. Though Motwane allowed her to extensively experiment, Jubilee was one of her hardest score. She added that she was heavily influenced by the cinema of the 1950s, mostly Bengali films, and had found a cultural identification point through this series, and connected with the renaissance chiaroscuro and attention detail. This prompted her to utilize orchestral instruments for composition.

=== Track listing ===
No.	Title	Length
1.	"Fanfare"	0:47
2.	"One Night in Lucknow"	6:08
3.	"The Audition"	3:12
4.	"Madan Kumar Bh*nc#%d"	2:24
5.	"Madan's Ghost"	6:42
6.	"Independence Day"	4:30
7.	"A Friend in the Refugee Camp"	3:40
8.	"A Star is Born Pt 1"	2:42
9.	"Rehearsals in Mussoorie"	3:18
10.	"A Star is Born Pt 2"	2:39
11.	"Give Me One More Chance"	4:16
12.	"The Trial"	3:50
13.	"Goodbye Roy Talkies"	4:21
Total length:		48:32

=== Reception ===
According to Shomini Sen, "Alokananda Dasgupta's background score also adds heft to the narrative." Nandini Ramnath of Scroll.in considered Dasgupta's score as "plangent", while Chatterjee called it "sublimely sophisticated". Uday Bhatia of Mint wrote "the real star is Alokananda Dasgupta’s score, a constantly inventive commentary on the action".

=== Accolades ===
Award	Date of ceremony	Category	Nominee	Result	Ref.
Filmfare OTT Awards	26 November 2023	Best Background Music (Series)	Alokananda Dasgupta	Won	
