= Faria Abdullah =

Indian actress

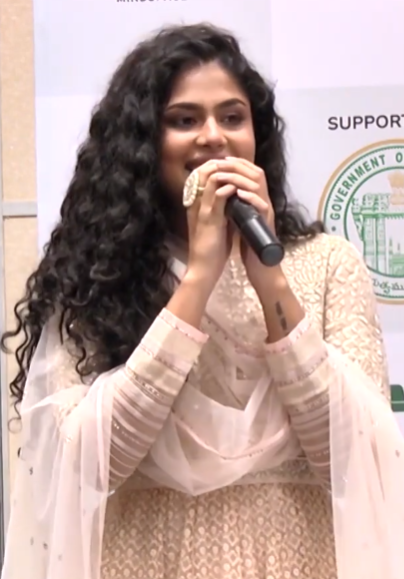
- Faria Abdullah in June 2022
- Born: Faria Sulthana Begum; 21 June 1998 (age 28); Hyderabad, Andhra Pradesh (present-day Telangana), India
- Education: Loyola Academy, Secunderabad
- Occupation: Actress
- Years active: 2021–present

Faria Abdullah (born 21 June 1998) is an Indian actress who works in Telugu films. She was a theatre artiste, and debuted in films with Jathi Ratnalu (2021), which was her breakthrough. Faria is a recipient of a Gaddar Telangana Film Award for her performance in Mathu Vadalara 2 (2024).

Abdullah went on to portray lead roles in the films Like, Share & Subscribe and Ravanasura, and portrays the main character in the streaming series The Jengaburu Curse.

== Early and personal life ==
Faria Abdullah was born in Hyderabad, India to Sanjay Abdhullah and Kausar Sultana. She hails from an Urdu-speaking Muslim family. For her film career, she learnt Telugu for a couple of years prior to Jathi Ratnalu.

In August 2026, Abdullah was trolled on social media for her participation in Bonalu, a Hindu festival. In response, she cited her secular upbringing, saying that her parents had taught her to "see the positive side of different faiths".

== Career ==
Abdullah originally worked as a theatre actress. In 2021, she switched to film with Jathi Ratnalu. While pursuing Mass Communication at Loyola College, Hyderabad, she met producer Nag Ashwin who visited the campus as chief guest for an event and he asked her if she was interested in acting in one of his productions and she auditioned for the role. She learnt Telugu for a couple of years and dubbed for the film. Regarding her role, Sangeetha Devi Dundoo of The Hindu wrote that "Faria has a good screen presence and holds her own among the three madcaps". In an interview in 2023 she declared that her public image had remained closely associated with that role, for which she was nominated at the 10th South Indian International Movie Awards, held in 2022. She then played lead roles in the films Like, Share & Subscribe in 2022, and Ravanasura in 2023. The same year Abdullah made her first appearance on the Hindi streaming series, The Jengaburu Curse, in which she plays the main character: the series, her debut in Hindi, was released on 9 August 2023.

In 2023, a first look of Allari Naresh's film, tentatively titled Naresh61, was released, and it was revealed that Abdullah also starred in the film. In 2024, a first look of Abdullah was released from Mathu Vadalara 2, a sequel to a 2019 film Mathu Vadalara, starring Sri Simha Koduri.

== Filmography ==
Key
†	Denotes films that have not yet been released

- All films are in Telugu unless otherwise noted.

Year	Title	Role	Notes	Ref.
2021	Jathi Ratnalu	Advocate Shamili "Chitti"	Debut film	
2021	Most Eligible Bachelor	Meenakshi	Guest appearance	
2022	Bangarraju	Bujji	Cameo appearance in the "Vaasivaadi Tassadiyya" song	
2022	Like, Share & Subscribe	Vasudha		
2023	Ravanasura	Advocate Kanaka Mahalakshmi		
2024	Aa Okkati Adakku	Siddhi		
2024	Kalki 2898 AD	Dancer in the Complex	Cameo appearance	
2024	Mathu Vadalara 2	Inspector Nidhi	Also choreographer, lyricist, and singer of "Drama Nakko Mama"	
2025	Gurram Paapi Reddy	Soudamini	Also lyricist and singer of "Paapi Paapi"	
2026	Anaganaga Oka Raju	Peetambari	Cameo appearance	
2026	Gaayapadda Simham	Shalini		
2026	Sigma	RJ Sam	Tamil film	

=== Television ===
Year	Title	Role	Network	Notes	Ref.
2017	Nakshatra	Nakshatra	YouTube		
2023	The Jengaburu Curse	Priyamvada Das	SonyLIV	Hindi TV series	
2025	Dance Ikon	Judge	Aha	Season 2	

=== Short films ===
- The Best Worst Date - Hyderabad Diaries (YouTube)
- When Two Friends Like Same Girl - Hyderabad Diaries (YouTube)

== Awards and nominations ==
Year	Award	Category	Work	Result	Ref.
2021	South Indian International Movie Awards	Best Female Debut – Telugu	Jathi Ratnalu	Nominated	
2025	Gaddar Telangana Film Awards	Special Mention	Mathu Vadalara 2	Won	
