= Jeet Ki Zid =

Indian web series

- Genre: Military drama
- Inspired by: Life of Indian Army; Major Deependra Singh Sengar
- Written by: Akash Chawla; Arunava Joy Sengupta
- Screenplay by: Siddharth Mishra
- Directed by: Vishal Mangalorkar; Arnav Chakravarti
- Starring: Amit Sadh; Amrita Puri; Sushant Singh; Aly Goni; Gagan Randhawa; Mrinal Kulkarni
- Composer: Pritam
- Country of origin: India
- Original language: Hindi
- No. of seasons: 1
- No. of episodes: 7 (list of episodes)

Production
- Producers: Akash Chawla; Boney Kapoor; Arunava Joy Sengupta
- Production location: India
- Cinematography: Akhilesh Shrivastava
- Editor: Yusuf Habibullah Khan
- Camera setup: Multi-camera
- Running time: 40 mins

Original release
- Network: ZEE5
- Release: 22 January 2021

Jeet Ki Zid is a streaming television series which premiered on ZEE5 on 22 January 2021. The seven-part series is directed by Vishal Mangalorkar. It is based on the life of a retired Indian Army special forces officer Major Deependra Singh Sengar played by Amit Sadh.

== Plot ==
The series is based on the true story of a Special Forces Officer, Major Deep Singh, who was left paralysed waist down during the Kargil War, but his relentless attitude helped him bounce back in life. The narrative revolves around Deep's journey during different timelines, when Major Deep Sengar joins the Special Forces. He gets into multiple combat situations in North East and in Jammu & Kashmir (1999). He was injured once when multiple bullets hit him in the stomach. He recovered and went back into combat. He took part in Operation Vijay and captured an important peak. He was later injured in combat and was declared to be in bed for life due to the severity of his injuries.

== Cast ==
- Amit Sadh as Major Deependra Singh Sengar (Para SF)
- Amrita Puri as Jaya
- Sushant Singh as Colonel Ranjeet Chaudhary (Para SF)
- Aly Goni as Surya Sethi
- Gagan Randhawa as Dipti
- Mrinal Kulkarni

== Episodes ==
| No. overall | No. in season | Title | Directed by | Written by | Original release date |
|---|---|---|---|---|---|
| 1 | 1 | "A Personal Reason" | Vishal Mangalorkar | Akash Chawla, Arunava Joy Sengupta | 22 January 2021 |
| 2 | 2 | "Thirty Seconds" | Vishal Mangalorkar | Akash Chawla, Arunava Joy Sengupta | 22 January 2021 |
| 3 | 3 | "Balidaan" | Vishal Mangalorkar | Akash Chawla, Arunava Joy Sengupta | 22 January 2021 |
| 4 | 4 | "Kargil" | Vishal Mangalorkar | Akash Chawla, Arunava Joy Sengupta | 22 January 2021 |
| 5 | 5 | "Suicide" | Vishal Mangalorkar | Akash Chawla, Arunava Joy Sengupta | 22 January 2021 |
| 6 | 6 | "Bloody Loser!" | Vishal Mangalorkar | Akash Chawla, Arunava Joy Sengupta | 22 January 2021 |
| 7 | 7 | "The Army Behind The Army" | Vishal Mangalorkar | Akash Chawla, Arunava Joy Sengupta | 22 January 2021 |

== Reception ==
Mimansa Shekhar from The Indian Express stated "Jeet Ki Zid plays well in silences or without many dialogues in the most tense situations." Udita Jhunjhunwala from Scroll.in wrote "A heartening story of persistence and fortitude, Jeet Ki Zid is as much a tribute to that invisible army." Archika Khurana from Times Of India gave the series 3.5 stars out of 5 and reviewed the series as an inspiring tale of self-belief and determination.
