= Shabnam Pandey =

Indian Actress

Shabnam Pandey is an Indian actress known for her works exclusively in Hindi soap opera and cinema. her notable work includes Sadda Haq, Maharakshak: Aryan, Fear Files and Na Bole Tum Na Maine Kuch Kaha.
