= Sigma (film) =

- Theatrical release poster
- Directed by: Jason Sanjay
- Written by: Jason Sanjay
- Produced by: Allirajah Subaskaran; Jason Sanjay
- Starring: Sundeep Kishan; Faria Abdullah
- Cinematography: Krishnan Vasant
- Edited by: Praveen K. L.
- Music by: Thaman S
- Production companies: Lyca Productions; JSJ Media Entertainments
- Distributed by: Sakthi Films
- Release date: 2 October 2026
- Running time: 146 minutes
- Country: India
- Language: Tamil
- Budget: ₹30 crore

Sigma is a 2026 Indian Tamil language heist action comedy film written and directed by Jason Sanjay in his directorial debut and produced by Lyca Productions and JSJ Media Entertainments. The film stars Sundeep Kishan and Faria Abdullah. It was released on 2 October 2026 and received mixed reviews from critics who praised Sundeep's performance, technical aspects, humour portions, and production values but criticised the predictable narrative, storyline and screenplay. The film grossed around ₹13 crore (US$1.4 million) worldwide.

== Plot ==
Guru is a radio host struggling under the crushing weight of his father's massive financial debts. Desperate for quick cash to clear the liabilities and save his family home, Guru enters the dangerous, underground world of backdoor gambling and illicit casinos.

While navigating a secret gambling den operated by a criminal named Vincent, Guru accidentally stumbles upon a highly classified pen drive. This drive contains critical evidence, digital keys, and details tied to a massive ₹500-crore synthetic drug and money laundering network.

The network is controlled by a ruthless, powerful underworld kingpin and business magnate, Kotlapatti Veerayya Reddy, alongside his associate Ezhil. By intercepting the pen drive, Guru transitions from a debt-ridden underdog into a prime target hunted by Reddy's deadly syndicate.

Rather than running away, Guru decides to embrace a "lone wolf" maverick mindset—playing into the Gen Z "Sigma" trope—to fight back, settle his scores, and reclaim his life. He puts his radio-honed wit to use and recruits a ragtag, motley crew of struggling "nobodies" to launch a counter-attack.

Guru plans a daring, high-stakes heist targeting Veerayya Reddy's international assets, including a secure locker located abroad where the mafia hides its wealth. Alongside his close ally Sam, Guru must navigate complex technical traps, shifting loyalties, and dangerous double-crosses to outsmart the kingpin and execute the ultimate score.

== Cast ==
- Sundeep Kishan as Guru
  - Kamalesh Jagan as young Guru
- Faria Abdullah as RJ Sam
- Raju Sundaram as Dr. Neil
- Sampath Raj as Veerayya Reddy
- Shiv Panditt as Vincent
- Anbu Thasan as Kavithai Ganesh alias KG
- Yog Japee as "Y", an assassin
- Magalakshmi Sudarsanan as Sarangi
- Sheela Rajkumar as Guru's mother
- Kiran Konda as Ezhil
- Catherine Tresa as Sulochana (special appearance in the song "Sulochana")

== Production ==
=== Development ===
In August 2023, Lyca Productions announced that Jason Sanjay would direct its next feature . At the time, Lyca said it was looking at emerging stars and for "top-league technicians." An early September Times of India report listed Atharvaa, Dhruv Vikram, Harish Kalyan and Kavin among young actors reportedly being considered for the lead. On 14 September, Kavin was reported to be in final talks to play the lead. A few weeks later, it was reported that Yuvan Shankar Raja had reportedly been approached to compose the music, while again mentioning Kavin as the reported lead. In May 2024, Kavin addressed the reports himself. He said he had met Jason and the makers once, and that they had discussed his existing line-up of projects, but that there had been no further progress after that meeting.

On 29 November, Lyca officially announced that Sundeep Kishan would headline Jason's debut. Sundeep explained he liked the script, found it intriguing, felt it contained unique moments and Jason's storytelling and energy convinced him to sign. DT Next reported that Thaman S would compose the music, the film was expected to begin production in January 2025, and Jason and his team had undertaken a location recce. In a later interview with The Hollywood Reporter India, Sundeep explained that he met Jason's father, actor-turned politician C. Joseph Vijay at the pooja ceremony for Lokesh Kanagaraj's Leo in 2023. Vijay told Sundeep that "Jason really liked his work." A few months later, Jason contacted Sundeep and wanted to narrate his script.

In late 2024, composer Thaman, editor Praveen K. L. and cinematographer Krishnan Vasant were announced as part of the principal technical crew. Jason wrote the film. Later official credits identified Kaleel Raja, Sanjeev S and Ajaiy Ashok as additional screenplay writers. The film's title Sigma was announced in November 2025. Telugu actress Faria Abdullah was cast as the lead actress, making her Tamil debut.

=== Filming ===
By 25 February 2025, it was reported that principal photography had already begun and some portions had been shot. By 10 November, Lyca announced that 65 shooting days had been completed; representing approximately 95% of the film, and one song sequence remained. The same month, Lyca CEO G.K.M Tamil Kumaran praised Jason's planning and said completing 95% of the film within 65 days was an achievement for a debut director. Around December, reports emerged that Catherine Tresa had been involved in an item number. On 19 December, Lyca officially announced that filming had wrapped.

== Music ==
Sigma

Soundtrack album by Thaman S
- Released: 18 September 2026
- Recorded: 2025–2026
- Studios: V Studio, Chennai; Vibe, Hyderabad; New Edge, Mumbai
- Genre: Feature film soundtrack
- Length: 18:06
- Language: Tamil
- Label: Saregama
- Producer: Thaman S

Thaman S chronology
Korean Kanakaraju (2026)	Sigma (2026)	Aadarsha Kutumbam House No: 47 (2026)

Singles from Sigma
- 1. "Sigma Style" Released: 4 June 2026; 2. "Ayyayo Ammaadi" Released: 12 August 2026; 3. "Rage Of Sigma" Released: 8 September 2026

The film's soundtrack is composed by Thaman S.

Track listing
No.	Title	Lyrics	Singer(s)	Length
1.	"Sigma Style"	Smile Tupakeys, Mc Rude	Thaman S, Smile Tupakeys, Mc Rude	3:27
2.	"Ayyayo Ammaadi"	Vivek	Yuvan Shankar Raja, Sanjana Kalmanje	3:31
3.	"Rage Of Sigma"	Super Subu	Sean Roldan, Thaman S	4:01
4.	"Sulochana"	Super Subu	Sanvi Sudeep	2:45
5.	"Underdog Anthem"	Super Subu, Kannadasan	Santhosh Narayanan, J. P. Chandrababu	3:15
6.	"Ayyayo Ammaadi" (reprise)	Vivek	M. M. Monissha	1:07
Total length:				18:06

== Release ==
Sigma was originally scheduled to release on 31 July 2026, but was delayed to avoid a box office clash with Vijay's Jana Nayagan which secured a 23 July release. Eventually, it was released on 2 October 2026. Sakthi Films distributed the film in Tamil Nadu.

== Reception ==
Sigma received mixed reviews from critics.

M. Suganth of The Times of India wrote, "Perhaps if it had been a regular debut director, Sigma's flaws could have been attributed to lesser control over the production, but given the budget and scale that Jason Sanjay operates with, it feels like a missed opportunity". Janani K of India Today said it "lacks conviction, invention and a clear sense of direction. For Jason Sanjay, it is a disappointing debut — a film that has all the ingredients for a heist, but somehow forgets to make the heist exciting".

Manivasagan Namasivayam of DT Next wrote, "Sigma is an ambitious debut from Jason Sanjay, with a premise that offers considerable scope for a commercial action-heist film. However, the weak screenplay and predictable template prevent the film from making the most of its potential". Akshay Kumar of Cinema Express called it a "curious amalgamation of everything and nothing. The opportunities to go bonkers with the plot, using the heist party's professions and the different antagonists' agendas, were endless. But the film is a classic case of how ideas can only take a film so far". Sreeju Sudhakaran of Rediff.com wrote it had potential to be a "kickass heist thriller" but suffered due to its "lazy writing and bland execution".
