= Operation Parindey =

Indian film directed by Sanjay Gadhvi

- Film poster
- Directed by: Sanjay Gadhvi
- Written by: Tejas Dhhanraj
- Starring: Amit Sadh; Rahul Dev; Aakash Dahiya; Amit Gaur; Rucha Inamdar; Kunal Kumar
- Cinematography: Arkodeb Mukherjee
- Edited by: Mukesh Thakur
- Distributed by: Zee5
- Release date: 28 February 2020
- Running time: 60 minutes
- Country: India
- Language: Hindi

Operation Parindey is a 2020 Indian action film directed by Sanjay Gadhvi, written by Tajas Dhhanraj and produced by Arti Gudal. The movie released on 28 February 2020 starring Amit Sadh and Rahul Dev. The movie marked the final directorial work of Sanjay Gadhvi before his death on 19 November 2023.

== Cast ==
- Amit Sadh as STF Abhinav Mathur
- Rahul Dev as Monty Singh
- Aakash Dahiya as Pabbi
- Amit Gaur as Kartar Singh
- Rucha Inamdar as STF Komal Bhardawaj
- Kunal Kumar as Srini
- R Badree as Rajan
