= Prinal Oberoi =

Indian television actress

- Born: Prinal Oberoi; Mumbai, India
- Occupations: Actress, Model
- Years active: 2007–present

Prinal Oberoi Singh is an Indian actress who primarily works in Hindi serials. Prinal is best known and popular for the role of Empress Charumitra in Colors TV's serial Chakravartin Ashoka Samrat. Prinal also worked in a Gujarati film. She is also known for the movie Mumbai Meri Jaan by R. Madhavan. She has worked in Colors TV's Na Bole Tum Na Maine Kuch Kaha, Pyaar Ka Dard Hai Meetha Meetha Pyaara Pyaara.

== Personal life ==
Completed her Schooling from Sir C.J High School Tardeo. Prinal married co-actor Pankaj Singh in Feb 2014 in Varanasi. They had a year long courtship.

== Filmography ==
=== Films ===
Year	Title	Role
2008	Kismat Konnection	Uttara/Kangana
2008	Mumbai Meri Jaan	Anusha
2025	Bhola no Bhagwan	
2025	Bharat Ni Dikri	

=== Television ===
Year	Serial	Role	Notes
2012	Na Bole Tum Na Maine Kuch Kaha	Ridhima	Season 1
2012, 2013	SuperCops vs Supervillains	Julie / Dolly	
2012–2014	Pyaar Ka Dard Hai Meetha Meetha Pyaara Pyaara	Kaira Varun Dhanrajgir	
2013	CID	Sheetal	
2013	Adaalat	Kanishka	
2014	Crime Patrol Dastakh	Jasmine Sheikh	
2015–2016	Chakravartin Ashoka Samrat	Maharani Charumitra	
2016/2017	Savdhaan India	Divya/Meena/Rashmi	
