= Stories by Rabindranath Tagore =

2015 Indian Hindi television series

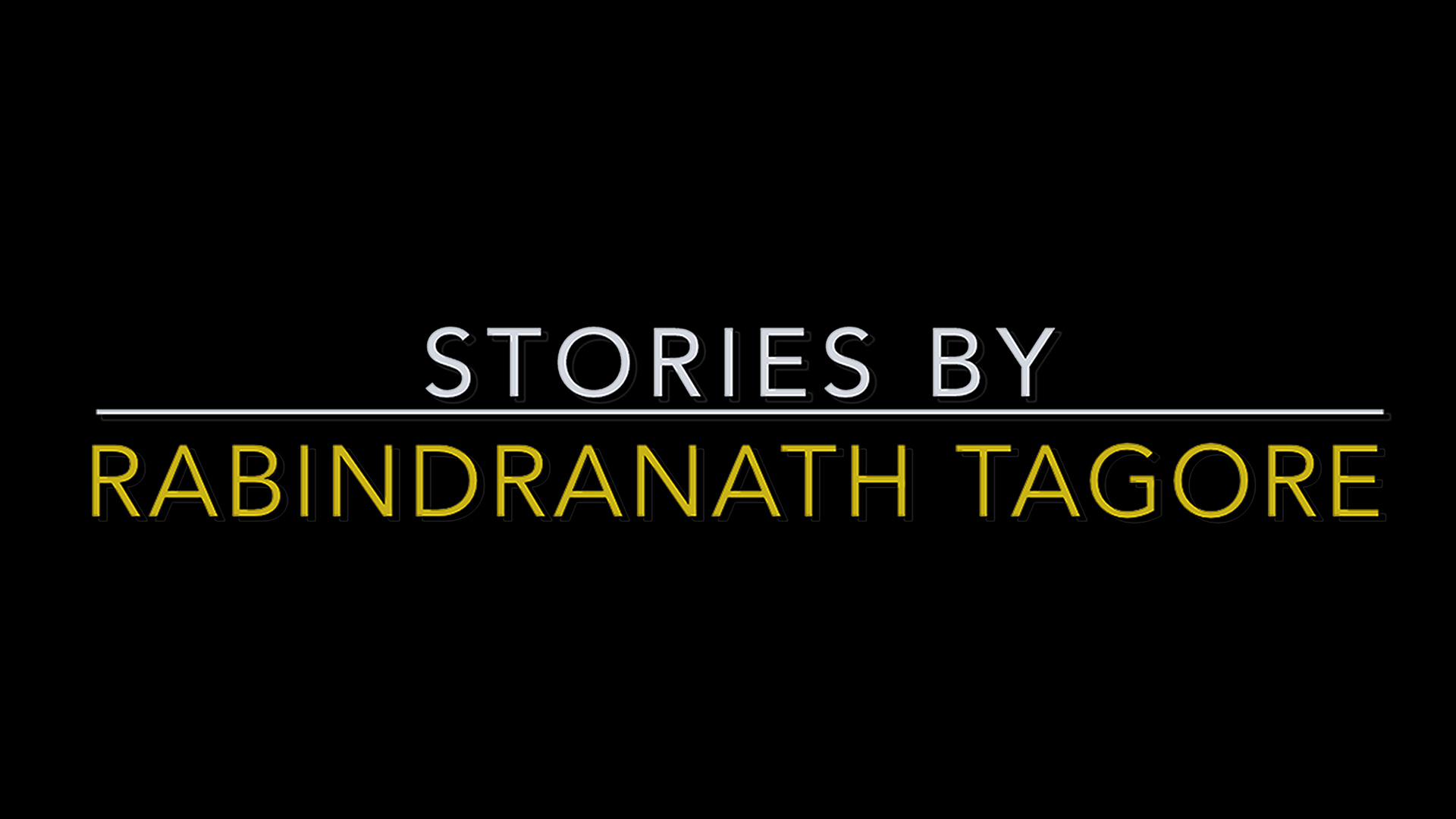
- Based on: Stories by Rabindranath Tagore
- Directed by: Anurag Basu; Debatma Mandal; Tani Basu
- Starring: Radhika Apte; Shreya Narayan; Jannat Zubair Rahmani; Bhanu Uday; Tara Alisha Berry; Sumeet Vyas; Rohan Shah
- Country of origin: India
- Original language: Hindi
- No. of seasons: 1
- No. of episodes: 26

Production
- Production location: Mumbai
- Camera setup: Multi-camera
- Running time: 60 minutes
- Production company: Ishana Movies

Original release
- Network: Epic
- Release: 6 July 2015

Stories by Rabindranath Tagore is a 2015 Indian Hindi-language television series which aired on the Epic channel. It is directed by Anurag Basu.

== Overview ==
Set in Bengal of the 1920s, the show is a representation of the classic short stories by the Bengali writer and Nobel laureate Rabindranath Tagore. In his literary work, Tagore focused on relationships which were colored by human shortcomings and idiosyncrasies. More often than other fiction of Tagore's era, confident women were the protagonists of his stories, strong in their stead while cocooned in a conservative Indian society. In a culture where adultery, rebellion, sorrow, and death were a taboo, Tagore’s stories were progressive and brought a shift in the mindset of traditional Indian values. All the episodes are available on streaming network Epic On

== Episodes ==
| Story | Episodes | Title | Based on |
|---|---|---|---|
| 1 | 1, 2, 3 | Chokher Bali | Chokher Bali (Speck in the Eye; 1901 novella) |
| 2 | 4 | Atithi | Atithi (The Guest; 1895 short story) |
| 3 | 5 | Maanbhanjan | Maanbhanjan (Fury Appeased; 1895 short story) |
| 4 | 6 | Detective | Detective (1898 short story) |
| 5 | 7 | Kabuliwala | Kabuliwala (1892 short story) |
| 6 | 8 | Punishment | Shasti (Punishment; 1893 short story) |
| 7 | 9, 10 | Nastanirh | Nastanirh (The Broken Nest; 1901 novella) |
| 8 | 11 | Wafadaar | Khokababur Pratyabartan (The Return of Khokababu; 1891 short story) |
| 9 | 12, 13 | Samapti | Samapti (The Conclusion; 1893 short story) |
| 10 | 14 | Chutti | Chhuti (The Homecoming; 1892–93 short story) |
| 11 | 15 | Tyaag | Tyaag (The Renunciation; 1892 short story) |
| 12 | 16 | Waaris | Sampatti Samarpan (The Trust Property; 1891–92 short story) |
| 13 | 17, 18 | Two Sisters | Dui Bon (Two Sisters; 1933 novel) |
| 14 | 19 | Mrinal ki Chitthi | Strir Patra (Wife's letter; 1914 short story) |
| 15 | 20 | Aparichita | Aparichita (The Unknown Woman; 1916 short story) |
| 16 | 21 | Kankal | Kankal (The Skeleton; 1892 short story) |
| 17 | 22 | The Story of a Muslim Girl | Musalmanir Golpo (The Story of a Muslim Woman; 1941 short story) |
| 18 | 23, 24 | Dhai Aakhar Prem Ka | Shesh Rokkha (Saved at Last; 1926–1929 drama) |
| 19 | 25 | Monihara | Monihara (The Lost Jewels; 1898 short story) |
| 20 | 26 | Dalia | Daliya (Dalia, 1892 short story) |

== Cast ==
- Radhika Apte as Binodini (Episode – Chokher Bali)
- Bhanu Uday as Mahendra (Episode- Chokher Bali) and Shashank (Episode- Two Sisters)
- Tara Alisha Berry as Ashalata (Episode- Chokher Bali)
- Sumeet Vyas as Bihari (Episode- Chokher Bali)
- Rohan Shah as Tarapado (Episode- Atithi)
- Ditipriya Roy as Charu (Episode- Atithi)
- Amrita Puri as Charulata (Episode- Broken Nest)
- Rahul Bagga as Amol (Episode- Broken Nest)
- Joy Sengupta as Raicharan (Episode- Wafadaar)
- Chandan Anand as Upen (Episode – Punishment)
- Savita Prabhune as Apoorba's mother (Episode – Samapti)
- Jannat Zubair Rahmani as Bindu (Episode – Mrinal Ki Chitthi)
- Amrita Bagchi as Mrinal (Episode – Mrinal Ki Chitthi)
- Anupriya Goenka as Mrignoyonee (Episode kankaal)
- Abigail Jain as Kalyani (Episode – Aparichita)
- Shubhangi Atre Poorey as Kamla (Episode – The Story of a Muslim Girl)
- Shriya Sharma as Ameena (Episode – Dalia)
- Kiran Srinivas as Dalia/King Budh (Episode – Dalia)
- Shreya Narayan as Sharmi (Episode – Two Sisters)
- Jayashree Venketaramanan as Urmi (Episode – Two Sisters)
- Amitabh Bhattacharjee as Chandra Da (Episode – Dhai Akshar Prem Ka)
- Sainee Raj as Indumati (Episode – Dhai Akshar Prem Ka)
- Sudarshan Patil as Binod (Episode – Dhai Akshar Prem Ka)
- Vaibhav Raj Gupta as Godai (Episode – Dhai Akshar Prem Ka)
- Sudipti Parmar as Kamal (Episode – Dhai Akshar Prem Ka)
- Praveena Deshpande as Annapoorna chachi (Episode – Chokher Bali)
- Kranti Prakash Jha as Bhupati (Episode – The Broken Nest) and Anupam (Episode - Aparachita)
- Ronjini Chakraborty as Giribala (Episode – Fury Appeased)
- Abhishek Tewari as Apoorva (Episode – Samapti)
- Purvi Mundada as Monimala (Episode – Monimala)
- Chitrangada Satarupa as Mrinmayee

== Background and production ==
The show launched on 6 July 2015 on The EPIC Channel. In ‘Stories By Rabindranath Tagore’, Anurag Basu chose to translate the stories in his own way. He handpicked different stories like Chokher Bali, Charulata, Kabuliwala, Detective, Samapti, Chutti, etc. and created a unique background score for them. The show devoted two or three episodes to each novel, while short stories were narrated in a single episode. The director chose a unique way for these stories to unfold – each story was linked with the next in an intrinsic manner and the narration was blended with translations of Tagore's songs. The show covered over 14 stories in 26 episodes, each episode duration being 60 minutes. Bringing Tagore's stories to life is the acclaimed Indian film director, Anurag Basu who is renowned for his distinctive stories and visual story-telling in films. Basu began his career as an assistant director in television serials. He directed television shows belonging to various genres and went on to make films that received immense audience and critical appreciation, establishing himself as a successful Indian film director. After a long hiatus from television, Basu made a comeback to television with Stories by Rabindranath Tagore.

The show is set in old Kolkata. Basu produced a colossal set, and also filmed on location and used authentic costumes. Basu's wife, Tani Basu, led the creative development of the show to delve deeper into cultural references and political and social manifestations. Original music score and Tagore's Bengali songs were re-created to further enhance the appeal of the show. Indian singers like Arijit Singh, Shaan and Shalmali Kholgade lent their voices for these melodious soundtracks.

The EPIC Channel developed a marketing campaign ‘Epic at 10’ to fortify the show's time-slot. A mnemonic was established to signify the show's airing slot of 10 pm. Innovative marketing initiatives were taken to create awareness such as Twitter Alarm, Epic at 10 contest on social media, Live Twitter chats with Anurag Basu, special screenings for the media, and so on.

== Reception ==
Deccan Herald – "Basu's direction of Stories from Rabindranath Tagore is especially charming in its portrayal of the Bengali milieu of those times. From the clothes worn by the protagonists (especially the women in their puff-sleeved, lace-trimmed blouses and the saris worn the Bengali way) to the period furniture and the locales, everything is picture-perfect, as is the casual dropping of Bengali words."

DNA- "What makes the serial is the lighting, so canny that it becomes both narrator and character. In an amber chiaroscuro of a bygone era it details a range of moods from the stark to the tender. Basu has achieved a fine balance between the populist and the elite."

Business Standard – "While most of us have read Tagore, to see iconic stories such as Kabuliwala come to life is a different pleasure altogether. Moreover, the women in Tagore's stories are not scheming vessels of family politics. There is diversity of representation and each story is nuanced with many shades of grey. Basu has said in an interview that he was so tired of watching women on Indian TV that he jumped at the chance of adapting Tagore."

The Indian Express praised the show in the article, "Tagore's stories have a strange sense of gender equality: Anurag Basu" and spoke about Anurag Basu's brilliance and the genre-defying format of the show.

=== Awards and nominations ===
| Ceremony | Date | Category | Recipient | Result |
|---|---|---|---|---|
| 16th Indian Television Academy Awards | 13 November 2016 | Best Mini Series (Jury) | Ishana Movies | Won |

== See also ==
- List of works by Rabindranath Tagore
- Adaptations of works of Rabindranath Tagore in film and television
