= Gurram Paapi Reddy =

2025 Indian Telugu film by Murali Manohar

- Theatrical release poster
- Directed by: Murali Manohar
- Screenplay by: Murali Manohar
- Story by: Poorna Prajna
- Produced by: Venu Saddi; Amar Bura; Jayakanth
- Starring: Naresh Agastya; Faria Abdullah; Soumya Bollapragada
- Cinematography: Arjun Raja
- Edited by: Karthika Srinivas
- Music by: Krishna Saurabh Surampalli
- Production companies: MJM Motion Pictures; Bura and Saddi Creative Arts LLP
- Release date: 19 December 2025
- Running time: 160 minutes
- Country: India
- Language: Telugu

Gurram Paapi Reddy is a 2025 Indian Telugu-language crime comedy film co-written and directed by Murali Manohar. The film stars Naresh Agastya and Faria Abdullah in prominent roles.

The film was released on 19 December 2025.

== Cast ==
- Naresh Agastya as Gurram Paapi Reddy
- Faria Abdullah as Soudamini
- Brahmanandam as Judge Vaidyanathan
- Yogi Babu as Udraju
- Rajkumar Kasireddy as Military
- Vamshidhar Goud Kosgi as Chilipi
- Jeevan Kumar Naidu as Goyyi
- John Vijay as Hayagreeva
- Pradeep Ruda as Neelagreeva
- Rajendran as Sangi Reddy
- Prabhas Sreenu as Lingam
- Mayank Parakh
- Naga Mahesh

== Music ==
The background score and songs were composed by Krishna Saurabh Surampalli.

Track listing
| No. | Title | Lyrics | Singer(s) | Length |
|---|---|---|---|---|
| 1. | "Edhoti Chey Gurram Paapi Reddy" | Suresh Gangula, MC Chetan | MC Chetan, Lakshmi Meghana | 3:40 |
| 2. | "Paisa Dum Dum" | Suresh Gangula | Pranavam Sasi, Prateek Naganatham, Alina Dantis, Junior Nithya | 3:19 |
| 3. | "Paapi Paapi" | Faria Abdullah | Faria Abdullah | 2:36 |

== Release ==
=== Theatrical release ===
Gurram Paapi Reddy was released on 19 December 2025.

=== Home media ===
The digital streaming rights of the film were acquired by ZEE5. Following its theatrical release, the film premiered on the platform on 16 January 2026.

== Reception ==
Srivathsan Nadadhur of The Hindu stated in his review that, "Gurram Paapi Reddy is a smartly written and performed con-comedy that delivers laughs aplenty, though a few segments become indulgent". Suresh Kavirayani of Cinema Express rated the film 3 out of 5 and appreciated the writing, Niranjan Ram Reddy's dialogues, and the lead cast performances.
