= Maharakshak: Aryan =

Indian television show

- Show logo
- Genre: Action; Thriller; Fantasy
- Created by: Essel Vision Productions; Vivle Films
- Directed by: Swapnil Mahaling
- Country of origin: India
- Original language: Hindi
- No. of seasons: 01
- No. of episodes: 27

Production
- Running time: Approx. 50 minutes

Original release
- Network: Zee TV
- Release: 1 November 2014 – 1 February 2015

Maharakshak: Aryan is an Indian television show that premiered on 1 November 2014 on Zee TV. Aryan is the first amongst Zee TV's superhero trilogy 'Maharakshak' that will showcase the triumph of good over evil. Its sequel, Maharakshak: Devi, debuted 14 March 2015 on Zee TV.

== Plot summary ==
Maharakshak Aryan is a story of a college student Aryan. He has no clue about his supernatural powers until the day he turns 18.

As he discovers his powers and real identity, he faces and fights off the evils to protect Mani from getting into hands of evils and protects the world.

== Cast ==
- Aakarshan Singh as Aryan Sharma
- Vikramjeet Virk as Triloki
- Reena Aggarwal as Miyaki
- Khalid Siddiqui as Arjun Sharma
- Abigail Jain as Manasvi
- Rishabh Jain as Ishaan "Pissu" Sharma
- Parinita Seth as Amrita Sharma
- Shabnam Pandey as Riya
- Reshmi Ghosh as Vishkanya / Vishakha
- Mishal Raheja as Chhala
- Parag Tyagi as Lohaputra
- Aparna Kumar as Murtika
- Meghna Naidu as Swarnakha
- Paras Arora as Aseem
- Dimple Jhangiani as Yuvika
- Rucha Gujarathi as Yuvika
- Rajesh Khera as Senapati Karakasur
- Vishal Jethwa as Veer (Banasur)
- Thakur Anoop Singh as Kaal
- Alihassan Turabi as Haksa

== Game ==
Zee TV launched a mobile version game of this TV series, developed by Bigtrunk Communications.

== Successor ==
Another series named Maharakshak: Devi debuted 14 March 2015 on Zee TV. It was the second installment of the Maharakshak trilogy.
