= Aa Okkati Adakku (2024 film) =

2024 Indian romantic comedy film

- Theatrical release poster
- Directed by: Malli Ankam
- Produced by: Rajiv Chilaka
- Starring: Allari Naresh; Faria Abdullah
- Cinematography: Suryaa
- Edited by: Chota K. Prasad
- Music by: Gopi Sundar
- Production company: Chilaka Productions
- Release date: 3 May 2024
- Running time: 131 minutes
- Country: India
- Language: Telugu
- Budget: ₹10 crore

Aa Okkati Adakku (transl. Don't ask that one thing) is an Indian Telugu-language romantic comedy drama film directed by Malli Ankam. It is produced by Rajiv Chilaka and co-produced with Bharath Laxmipati under Chilaka Productions. The film stars Allari Naresh, Faria Abdullah, Vennela Kishore, Jamie Lever, Harsha Chemudu and Hari Teja in lead roles.

== Plot ==
A priest's prophecy tells Gana that he is destined to remain a lifelong bachelor if he does not get married within the next 25 days.

== Cast ==
- Allari Naresh as Ganapathi "Gana"
- Faria Abdullah as Siddhi, member of Happy Matrimony
- Jamie Lever as Devasena "Devi", Gana's sister-in-law, Subbu's wife & maternal cousin
- Ravi Krishna as Subramanyam "Subbu", Gana's younger brother, Devi's husband & maternal cousin
- Vennela Kishore as Kishore
- Harsha Chemudu as Abhinav
- Hari Teja as Divya
- Ajay as Surya Nayak
- Anish Kuruvilla as Ravindra, Head of Happy Matrimony
- Simran Choudhary - special appearance in "Rajadhi Raja" song
- Ariyana Glory as Lucky
- Raghu Babu as Astrologer
- Kalpa Latha
- Raja Chembolu as a fraud
- Rithu Chowdary - special appearance in "Rajadhi Raja" song
- Praveen as Gana's friend
- Aqsa Khan as Appu
- Goparaju Ramana as an accident victim
- Rajiv Kanakala as Devi's father, Gana, and Subbu's maternal uncle.

== Productions ==
On 16 February 2024, the title glimpse of the film was released.

== Soundtrack ==
The film soundtrack and background score were composed by Gopi Sundar. The first single from the film, "Oh Madam" was released, and Saregama secured the audio rights.

No.	Title	Lyrics	Singer(s)	Length
1.	"Oh Madam"	Bhaskarabhatla	Anurag Kulkarni	4:42
2.	"Hammammo"	Bhaskarabhatla	Yasaswi Kondepudi	4:35
3.	"Mangalyam"	Bhaskarabhatla	S. P. Charan, Ramya Behara	4:47
4.	"Rajadhi Raja"	Bhaskarabhatla	Mohana Bhogaraju, Dhanunjay Seepana	3:40

== Release ==
The film was released in theatres on 3 May 2024. The film premiered on Amazon Prime Video service on 31 May 2024.

== Reception ==
A critic from Times Now rated the film three out of five stars and wrote, "Aa Okkati Adakku fizzles out after establishing its characters in the first 15-20 minutes. A hurried climax and a series of overblown scenes don't help matters." Paul Nicodemus of The Times of India gave the film two-and-a-half out of five stars and wrote, "Aa Okkati Adakku is a film of moments rather than a cohesive whole. It is an ensemble that shines in parts but ultimately falls short of its potential. For enthusiasts of Allari Naresh’s earlier work, this film offers a glimpse of his vintage charm, albeit within a narrative that could have been more compelling."

Abhilasha Cherukuri of The New Indian Express gave it two out of five stars and wrote, "Allari Naresh and Faria Abdullah shine intermittently, and the joke is on us for believing the film could be anything more than that." Raghu Bandi of The Indian Express gave it one-and-a-half out of five stars and wrote, "Compared to recent comedy hits in Telugu, the writing here is not funny enough. Particularly the first half gets tedious towards the interval. Even during the second half, the narrative entirely changes focus to talk about matrimonial agencies and their wrong practices. The comic tone of the film disappears entirely and the movie suffers due to this."

Prakash Pecheti of The South First gave it one-and-a-half out of five stars and noted that "The director falls short in various aspects. The story lags due to subpar comedy and weak writing." Bhuvanesh Chandar of The Hindu wrote, "Aa Okkati Adakku has a shoddily-written screenplay, and with every following scene, it only goes from dreadful to downright trashy. If the film succeeds in anything, unintentionally may I say, it is in making you wish you never meet people like the one-dimensional leads, on matrimonial sites... and in life in general."
