= Duranga =

Indian Hindi-language web-series

- Genre: Crime Thriller
- Created by: Goldie Behl
- Inspired by: Flower of Evil
- Written by: Charudutt Acharya
- Screenplay by: Charudutt Acharya
- Directed by: Pradeep Sarkar, Aijaz Khan (Season 1); Rohan Sippy (Season 2)
- Starring: Gulshan Devaiah; Drashti Dhami; Amit Sadh
- Music by: Ripul Sharma & George Joseph
- Country of origin: India
- Original language: Hindi
- No. of seasons: 2
- No. of episodes: 17

Production
- Executive producer: Anup Poddar
- Producer: Goldie Behl Shraddha Singh
- Cinematography: Quais Waseeq
- Editors: Abhijit Desphande & Hrishikesh Petwe
- Production company: Rose Audio Visuals pvt. Ltd

Original release
- Network: ZEE5
- Release: 19 August 2022 – 24 October 2023

Related
- Flower of Evil

Duranga is an Indian Hindi-language ZEE5 web-series adapted from the Korean drama Flower of Evil - making it the first official remake of a Korean drama in India. The first season premiered on 19 August 2022 and was directed by Pradeep Sarkar and Aijaz Khan. It features Gulshan Devaiah and Drashti Dhami.

Following the first season's success, the series was renewed for the second season. It premiered on October 24, 2023, and is directed by Rohan Sippy. Amit Sadh joined the cast as one of the primary characters.

== Plot ==
While investigating a gory copy-cat killing that follows the modus operandi of a 17 year old serial killing case, a Mumbai crime branch officer re-opens the spine-chilling case that had rocked a small coastal town near Mumbai, only to find out that there was an accomplice who was never nabbed. To her horror, that partner in crime could be her life partner, the doting father of her six-year-old daughter, her ‘perfect’ husband of 11 years.

== Cast ==
- Gulshan Devaiah as Abhishek Banne/Sammit Patel (fake)
- Drashti Dhami as Ira Jaykar Patel
- Amit Sadh as Sammit Patel (Real)/Professor Dev Sahni (fake)
- Abhijeet Khandkekar as Vikas Sarode
- Divya Seth as Anupriya Patel
- Hera Mishra as Anya Sammit Patel
- Rajesh Khattar as Dr. Manohar Patel
- Zakir Hussain as Bala Banne
- Barkha Bisht as Prachi Banne
- Nivedita Saraf as Gayatri Jaykar
- Sanjay Gurbaxani as Shekher Bakshi
- Kiran Srinivas as Nikhil Pradhan
- Sparsh Walia as Laksh Ranade
- Vitthal Patil as Victor Telkar
- Tanuka Laghate as Neelam Singh
- Meenal Kapoor as Teesta Basu
- Mahadev Singh lakhawat as Dheeraj kumar

== Reception ==
=== Season 1 ===
Duranga received mostly positive reviews from critics. Ruchi Kaushal of Hindustan Times wrote, "Creator Goldie Behl deserves a bow this time for the clarity with which he presents the intense, multi-climax drama". Saibal Chatterjee of NDTV gave it 3 stars and concludes," it delivers a steady stream of twists and turns designed to keep you hooked from start to finish." Nandini Ramnath of Scroll.in wrote, "Once you accept Duranga’s premise – the son of a serial killer himself accused of murder who marries a police officer while on the run from the law – it’s easy enough to swallow everything that follows.". Manisha Lakhe of Network18 remarked, "Zee 5 has hit the jackpot with this show. This could trigger a trend of production companies seeking K-dramas for remakes.".

On the contrary, Lakshana N Palat of The Indian Express rated it low and wrote "Duranga misses each opportunity to craft a deeply moving, impactful and suspense-ridden show."

=== Season 2 ===
The Times of India rated it 3.5 out of 5, and commented, "The well-drawn characters and numerous plot twists keep viewers engaged throughout". News18 India praised the show stating, "Amit Sadh and Gulshan Devaiah Are Brilliant In Gripping Psychological Thriller."

The show drew flak from Deepa Gahlot who in her review wrote, "Mental health advocates will find plenty to get upset about."
