= Jack and Dil =

2018 Indian romantic comedy film

- Directed by: Sachin P. Karande
- Written by: Sanjeev Dutta
- Produced by: Sagar S. Sinagare; Sandesh Jadhav; Yogesh Singh
- Starring: Amit Sadh; Arbaaz Khan; Sonal Chauhan; Evelyn Sharma; Rajdeep Choudhury
- Cinematography: Duleep Regmi
- Edited by: Mukesh Thakur
- Music by: Arko Pravo Mukherjee; Argya Banarjee; Ramji Gulati; Background Score: Parivesh Singh
- Production companies: Balcony Films; Rock in Rolla Entertainment
- Distributed by: Online Marketing Sudhanshu Kumar
- Release date: 2 November 2018
- Running time: 98 minutes
- Country: India
- Language: Hindi

Jack and Dil is a Bollywood romantic comedy film, starring Amit Sadh, Sonal Chauhan, Arbaaz Khan and Evelyn Sharma in lead roles. The film is written by Sanjeev Dutta and directed by Sachin P Karande. This film is being produced by Balcony Films and Entertainment.

== Plot ==
Earning as much to meet his daily needs, Jack (Amit Sadh), a comical detective is hired by Walia (Arbaaz Khan) to spy on his wife Shilpa (Sonal Chauhan) when he suspects her of having an affair. Things go upside down when Jack ends up falling in love with his client's wife.

== Cast ==
- Amit Sadh as Jack
- Arbaaz Khan as KK Walia
- Sonal Chauhan as Shilpa Walia
- Evelyn Sharma as Lara
- Rajdeep Choudhury as Mystery Man
- Godaan Kumar as Seller

== Reception ==
Sukanya Verma of Rediff.com gave the film 1 out of 5 stars and stated, "Between Sadh's feelings for a dog, two girls and man he may or may not help reconcile with his wife, Jack and Dil feels like a marathon to nowhere. It's not funny when it ends with one." Pallabi Dey Purkayastha of Times of India gave the film 1.5 stars out 5 and stated, "Unless these three reasonably good artistes have big debts to clear, I don’t see a reason as to why anyone in their right minds would say yes to a chaotic rom-com like ‘Jack & Dil’." Troy Ribeiro of News18 gave the film 2 out of 5 stars and stated, "The plot is clumsy and characters superficial with cardboard thin arcs. Arbaaz Khan's film is a sheer waste of time." Devesh Sharma of Filmfare gave the film 2 out of 5 stars and stated, "The cinematography, editing, even music are strictly average fare. The writing is in total shambles."

== Soundtrack ==
Jack and Dil

Soundtrack album by Arko Pravo Mukherjee, Argya Banarjee and Ramji Gulati
- Released: 29 October 2018
- Recorded: 2018
- Genre: Feature film soundtrack
- Length: 21:21
- Language: Hindi
- Label: Zee Music Company
External audio
- Official Audio Jukebox on YouTube

Arko Pravo Mukherjee chronology
Satyameva Jayate (2018)	Jack and Dil (2018)	Bombairiya (2019)

The album is composed by Arko Pravo Mukherjee, Argya Banarjee and Ramji Gulati while the lyrics penned by Vayu, Bipin Das, Ramji-Mack and Arafat Mehmood.

Track listing
No.	Title	Lyrics	Music	Singer(s)	Length
1.	"Chuski"	Vayu	Arko Pravo Mukherjee	Arko, Sonu Kakkar	3:36
2.	"Ishq Slow Slow"	Bipin Das	Ramji Gulati	Ramji Gulati	3:17
3.	"Dil Mastiyaan"	Arafat Mehmood	Arghya Banerjee	Ash King, Payal Dev	5:26
4.	"Bezuban Dil Ki" (Version-1)	Ramji-Mack	Ramji Gulati	Ramji Gulati	4:31
5.	"Bezuban Dil Ki" (Version-2)	Ramji-Mack	Ramji Gulati	Shibani Kashyap	4:31
Total length:					21:21
