= Jayashree Venketaramanan =

Indian actress

- Occupation: Actress
- Years active: 2011-present
- Known for: Beend Banoongaa Ghodi Chadhunga; Na Bole Tum Na Maine Kuch Kaha; Hum Paanch Phir Se; Thinkistan
- Spouse: Akhlaque Khan (m. 2020)

Jayashree Venketaramanan is an Indian actress who primarily works in Hindi television and web shows. She made her acting debut in 2011 with Beend Banoongaa Ghodi Chadhunga portraying Sarika Poddar. She is best known for her portrayal of Navika Bhatnagar in Na Bole Tum Na Maine Kuch Kaha 2 and Kajal Mathur in Hum Paanch Phir Se.

Venketaramanan made her web debut with Breathe (2018) and is best known for her role in Thinkistan (2019).

== Personal life ==
Venketaramanan tied the knot with her longtime boyfriend, actor Akhlaque Khan on March 3, 2020, in a court in Mumbai.

== Career ==
=== Debut and success (2011–2017) ===
Venketaramanan made her acting debut with Beend Banoongaa Ghodi Chadhunga portraying Sarika Poddar alongside Anuj Thakur and later Naman Shaw from 2011 to 2012.

In 2013, her portrayal of Navika "Nanhi" Bhatnagar Tilakdari in Na Bole Tum Na Maine Kuch Kaha 2 opposite Siddharth Arora marked a turning point in her career. The same year she appeared as Mehak in Yeh Hai Aashiqui alongside Jugal Hansraj.

She played Shivi and the host in TV Shivi in 2014. She portrayed Appu Chowdhury in Zindagi Khatti Meethi opposite Abhishek Tiwari, Urmimala "Urmi" in Stories by Rabindranath Tagore and Naina in Yeh Hai Aashiqui opposite Zaan Khan, all in 2015.

She also appeared in an episode of Code Red Talaash. From 2017 to 2018, she portrayed Kajal Mathur/Kajal Bhai in Hum Paanch Phir Se. In 2017, she appeared in two short film, Kissss as Ichcha and #Free Basics.

=== Recent work and web career (2019-present) ===
Venketaramanan made her web debut with Amazon Prime's Breathe portraying Anita Sahani. She appeared as Parul in POPxo's Unmarried alongside Sanchay Goswami the same year.

She portrayed Priya in MX Player's Thinkistan opposite Shravan Reddy and Riddhi in Shitty Ideas Trending's Yours Cupidly opposite Skand Sanjeev Thakur, both in 2019.

In 2021, she appeared as Anita in Eros Now's Hindmata. Since 2022, she is portraying various characters including Rosy/ Rita in her husband's series Biwi & Me.

== Filmography ==
=== Television ===
| Year | Title | Role | Notes | Ref. |
|---|---|---|---|---|
| 2011–2012 | Beend Banoongaa Ghodi Chadhunga | Sarika Poddar | | |
| 2013 | Na Bole Tum Na Maine Kuch Kaha 2 | Navika "Nanhi" Bhatnagar | | |
| 2013 | Yeh Hai Aashiqui | Mehak | Episode: "Love All" | |
| 2014 | TV Shivi | Shivi | Host | |
| 2015 | Zindagi Khatti Meethi | Appu Chowdhury | | |
| 2015 | Stories by Rabindranath Tagore | Urmimala "Urmi" | Episode: "Two Sisters" | |
| 2015 | Yeh Hai Aashiqui | Naina | Episode: "Never Been Kissed" | |
| 2015 | Code Red Talaash | Unknown | | |
| 2017–2018 | Hum Paanch Phir Se | Kajal Mathur/Kajal Bhai | | |

=== Web series ===
| Year | Title | Role | Notes | Ref. |
|---|---|---|---|---|
| 2018 | Breathe | Anita Sahani | Season 1 | |
| 2018 | Unmarried | Parul | | |
| 2019 | Thinkistan | Priya | | |
| 2019 | Yours Cupidly | Riddhi | | |
| 2021 | Hindmata | Anita | | |
| 2022 | Biwi & Me | Rozy/Rita | | |

=== Short films ===
| Year | Title | Role | Ref. |
|---|---|---|---|
| 2017 | Kissss | Ichcha | |
| 2017 | Free Basics | Unknown | |

=== Theater ===
- Gulel Banaunga Chidiya Maroonga by Akhlaque Khan (2014)

== See also ==
- List of Indian television actresses
- List of Hindi television actresses
