= Na Bole Tum Na Maine Kuch Kaha =

Indian television series

- Genre: Drama
- Created by: Sunshine Productions
- Written by: Venita Coelho; Sonal Ganatra; Subrat Sinha
- Creative directors: Seema Sharma; Sudhir Sharma
- Starring: Kunal Karan Kapoor; Aakanksha Singh
- Country of origin: India
- Original language: Hindi
- No. of seasons: 2
- No. of episodes: 370

Production
- Producer: Sudhir Sharma
- Production locations: Indore; Mumbai
- Camera setup: Multi-camera
- Running time: 20-22 minutes
- Production company: Sunshine Productions

Original release
- Network: Colors TV
- Release: 9 January 2012 – 12 September 2013

Na Bole Tum Na Maine Kuch Kaha (transl. You didn't speak nor did I say anything) is an Indian Hindi-language drama television series that premiered from 9 January 2012 to 12 September 2013 on Colors TV. Produced under Sunshine Productions, it starred Kunal Karan Kapoor, Aakanksha Singh.

== Series overview ==
Season	No. of episodes	Originally broadcast (India)	
Season	No. of episodes	Series premiere	Series finale
1	196	9 January 2012	5 October 2012
2	174	14 January 2013	12 September 2013

== Plot ==
Megha Vyas, a young widow with two children, fights for justice to her late husband, Amar Vyas, who supposedly died in a flyover collapse, of which he is blamed for taking money and using low-quality material for construction. Mohan Bhatnagar, an honest reporter, works for a Hindi news company, Prabhat Leher. After a Rocky start, Mohan moves to Megha's neighborhood and befriends with Megha's daughter, Navika and the two share a bond.

Mohan collects evidence against Amar and produces it in front of the committee which was constituted to the case of the flyover collapse. He learns that Amar being Megha's late husband and decides to find Amar's innocence. Megha starts working in Prabhat Leher. Mohan exposes Dinanath, the real culprit behind the flyover collapse. It's revealed that Amar was killed by Dinanath when he attempted to expose Dinanath. Eventually, Mohan develops respect for Megha and they become friends. He realizes that he has fallen in love with her.

Megha initially rejects Mohan's love, but later accepts. Megha and Mohan get married. Mohan's mother, Indu unsuccessfully tries to ruin his marriage. Later, Megha and Mohan meet with an accident and Megha is paralyzed. Mohan takes care of her. Finally, Megha recovers and the family is happily reunited.

=== 12 years later ===
Megha lives with Vyas family and grown-up Navika, who works as a news reporter. The story regresses to 2001 and narrates the mystery of Megha's son, Aditya, who got lost in the Indore railway station. Megha and Mohan had separated post Aditya's missing. Back to present, Mohan lives in Bhopal with his adopted daughter, Rimjhim. Navika, who hates Mohan believing that he is the reason for Aditya's missing, joins Mohan's newspaper company and finishes a political report of an illegal politician, Purushottam Singh Tilkadhari. His grandson, Beera Singh Tilkadhari, falls in love with Navika and helps her to reconcile with Mohan. Mohan and Rimjhim return to Indore. Eventually, Megha-Mohan reunite and Rimjhim bonds with Megha.

Aditya, who hates Mohan, is working to Tilakdharis' as Manoj. He introduces the real Manoj, who is mentally thrown off, to Mohan as Aditya. Navika and Beera get married. Soon, Mohan learns that Manoj is the real Aditya. Eventually, the family is reunited while Aditya still has hate towards Mohan. During a family picnic, Mohan falls from a high cliff and presumed dead.

=== 2 years later ===
Megha and Rimjhim move to Mumbai. Alive but having memory loss, Mohan lives as Vasu Rajvardhan, who was killed by the latter's step-mother, Aai. Soon, Megha meets Vasu and realizes that he is actually Mohan. She exposes Aai. Aditya apologizes to Megha and Mohan for his mistakes. Eventually, Mohan remembers his past. Finally, Megha and Mohan once again return to Indore and reunite to live happily forever.

== Cast ==
=== Main ===
- Kunal Karan Kapoor as Mohan Bhatnagar – Star reporter turned Editor and Chief; Indu and Arvind's son; Rashmi's former boyfriend; Megha's second husband; Riddhima's ex-husband; Navika and Aditya's step-father; Rimjim's adoptive father (2012; 2013)
- Aakanksha Singh as Megha Vyas Bhatnagar – Amar's widow; Mohan's second wife; Navika and Aditya's mother; Rimjim's adoptive mother (2012; 2013)
- Jayashree Venketaramanan as Navika "Nanhi" Bhatnagar Tilakdari – Star reporter; Megha and Amar's daughter; Mohan's step-daughter; Aditya's sister; Rimjhim's adopted sister; Beera's wife (2013)
  - Ashnoor Kaur as Child Navika Vyas Bhatnagar (2012)
- Kanwar Dhillon as Aditya "Addu" Bhatnagar – Megha and Amar's son; Mohan's step-son; Navika's brother; Rimjhim's adopted brother; Ragini's husband (2013)
  - Vishesh Bansal / Shivansh Kotia as Child Aditya Vyas Bhatnagar (2012)

=== Recurring ===
- Reem Sheikh as Rimjhim Bhatnagar – Naina's daughter; Megha and Mohan's adopted daughter; Navika and Aditya's adopted sister (2013)
- Siddharth Arora as Beera Tilakdari – Purushottam's grandson; Ragini's brother; Navika's husband (2013)
- Pallavi Gupta as Ragini Tilakdhari Bhatnagar – Purushottam's granddaughter; Beera's sister; Aditya's wife (2013)
- Dushyant Wagh as Gurucharan "Guru" Brijwasi – Mohan's friend (2012; 2013)
- Rohit Bhardwaj as Amar Vyas – Vedkant and Saroj's younger son; Sanjay's brother; Megha's first husband; Navika and Aditya's father (2012) (Dead)
- Anjan Srivastav as Vedkant Vyas – Bela's brother; Saroj's husband; Sanjay and Amar's father; Tanmay, Navika and Aditya's grandfather (2012; 2013)
- Madhuri Bhandiwdekar as Saroj Vyas – Vedkant's wife; Sanjay and Amar's mother; Tanmay, Navika and Aditya's grandmother (2012; 2013)
- Madhuri Sanjeev as Bela Vyas – Vedkant's sister; Sanjay and Amar's aunt; Tanmay, Navika and Aditya's grandaunt (2012; 2013)
- Rinku Karmarkar as Renu Vyas – Sanjay's wife; Tanmay's mother (2012; 2013)
- Sachin Parikh as Sanjay Vyas – Vedkant and Saroj's elder son; Amar's brother; Renu's husband; Tanmay's father (2012)
- Akhlaque Khan as Tanmay "Tannu" Vyas – Renu and Sanjay's son; Navika and Aditya's cousin; Aarti's husband (2013)
  - Nirav Soni as Teenage Tanmay Vyas (2012)
- Bhamini Oza as Aarti Vyas – Tanmay's wife (2013)
- Neelu Kohli as Indu Bhatnagar – Arvind's wife; Mohan's mother; Navika and Aditya's step-grandmother; Rimjhim's adoptive grandmother (2012)
- Vikram Kapadia as Arvind Bhatnagar – Indu's husband; Mohan's father; Navika and Aditya's step-grandfather; Rimjhim's adoptive grandfather (2012)
- Prinal Oberoi as Ridhima – Mohan's ex-wife (2012)
- Anil Rastogi as Purushottam Singh Tilakdhari – Beera and Ragini's grandfather (2013)
- Puneet Panjwani as Prateek Agarwal – Prerna's husband (2012)
- Geeta Bisht] as Prerna Agarwal – Prateek's wife; Megha's childhood friend (2012)
- Karan Thakur as Guddu Khatri (2012)
- Navina Bole as Koel – Dinanath's girlfriend (2012)
- Ankush Bali as Karan – Mohan's friend (2012)
- Manish Gandhi as Manoj / Fake Aditya Bhatnagar – Disabled man who impersonates Aditya (2013)
- Khalid Siddiqui as Manav Chaturvedi – Renu's cousin; Megha's proposed groom (2012)
- Mehendi Jain as Nidhi – Chanchal's daughter (2012)
- Shabnam Pandey as Dimpy – Prateek and Prerna's relative (2012)
- Pooja Kanwal Mahtani as Rashmi Bharadwaj – Mohan's former girlfriend (2012)
- Karan Suchak as Gautam (2012)
- Shilpa Mehta as Rukmini Bharadwaj (2012)
- Aradhana Uppal as Anupama Sachdeva - Navika's boss (2013)
- Bharti Patil as Aai – Vasu's step-mother (2013)
- Nupur Alankar as Jyotiba Vaidya – Shridhar's wife; Rukku's mother (2013)
- Lalit Parimoo as Shridhar Vaidya – Jyotiba's husband; Rukku's father (2013)
- Aasiya Kazi as Rukku Vaidya – Shridhar and Jyotiba's daughter (2013)
- Jatin Sharma as Bala – Vasu's friend (2013)
- Preeti Puri as Naina Bhosle (fake) – Rimjim's fake mother (2013)

=== Guest appearances ===
- Drashti Dhami as Madhubala Kundra from Madhubala – Ek Ishq Ek Junoon
- Vivian Dsena as Rishabh Kundra (RK) from "Madhubala – Ek Ishq Ek Junoon"
- Sanaya Irani as Khushi Gupta Singh Raizada from "Iss Pyaar Ko Kya Naam Doon?"
- Ranveer Singh as from "Lootera
- Sonakshi Sinha as from "Lootera
- Barun Sobti as Arnav Singh Raizada from "Iss Pyaar Ko Kya Naam Doon?"
- Krystle D'Souza as Jeevika from "Ek Hazaaron Mein Meri Behna Hai"
- Karan Tacker as Viren from "Ek Hazaaron Mein Meri Behna Hai"
- Nia Sharma as Maanvi from "Ek Hazaaron Mein Meri Behna Hai"
- Kushal Tandon as Virat from "Ek Hazaaron Mein Meri Behna Hai"
- Gurmeet Choudhary as Yash from "Punar Vivaah – Zindagi Milegi Dobara"
- Kratika Sengar as Aarti from "Punar Vivaah – Zindagi Milegi Dobara"
- Dishank Arora as Prateek from "Punar Vivaah – Zindagi Milegi Dobara"
- Leena Jumani as Paridhi from "Punar Vivaah – Zindagi Milegi Dobara"
- Karan Singh Grover as Asad Ahmed Khan from "Qubool Hai"
- Surbhi Jyoti as Zoya Asad Ahmed Khan from "Qubool Hai"
- Dipika Kakar as Simar Bharadwaj from Sasural Simar Ka
- Dheeraj Dhoopar as Prem Bharadwaj from "Sasural Simar Ka"
- Avika Gor as Roli Bharadwaj from "Sasural Simar Ka"
- Manish Raisinghan as Siddhant Bharadwaj from "Sasural Simar Ka"
- Falaq Naaz as Jhanvi Bharadwaj from "Sasural Simar Ka"
- Tina Datta as Ichcha Bundela from Uttaran
- Vikas Bhalla as Veer Singh Bundela from "Uttaran"
- Rashami Desai as Tapasya Rathore from "Uttaran"
- Gaurav Chopra as Raghuvendra Pratap Rathore from "Uttaran"
- Toral Rasputra as Anandi from "Balika Vadhu"
- Sidharth Shukla as Shiv from "Balika Vadhu"
- Ankita Lokhande as Archana Manav Deshmukh from "Pavitra Rishta"
- Hiten Tejwani as Manav Deshmukh from "Pavitra Rishta"
- Rithvik Dhanjani as Arjun Kirloskar from "Pavitra Rishta"
- Asha Negi as Purvi Arjun Kirloskar from "Pavitra Rishta"
- Ankit Narang as Soham Deshmukh from "Pavitra Rishta"

== Production ==
=== Development ===
The series started on 9 January 2012 and went off-air due to Bigg Boss 6. The second season started after Bigg Boss ended. In the second season, it took a leap of 12 years where the child artists were replaced by their grown up versions.

=== Casting ===
Kunal Karan Kapoor was cast as the journalist Mohan. Aakanksha Singh was cast as the strong widow Megha, marking her acting debut. Ashnoor Kaur was cast as child Navika and Vishesh Bansal was cast as child Aditya.

Jayashree Venketaramanan was cast as the elder Navika, while Kanwar Dhillon was cast as elder Aditya, post the leap. Siddharth Arora was cast as Beera and Pallavi Gupta was cast as Ragini.

=== Filming ===
The series is set in Indore, Madhya Pradesh. It is mainly shot at the Film City, Mumbai. Some initial sequences were shot in Indore, including at Khajrana Ganesh Temple. The honeymoon sequence of Mohan and Megha was shot in Kathmandu, Nepal.

=== Cancellation ===
Na Bole Tum Na Maine Kuch Kaha went off air on 12 September 2013, after completing two seasons. It was replaced by Parichay.

== Crossovers ==
- The series had a crossover with Balika Vadhu in 2012, when Mohan and Megha attended Shiv and Anandi's wedding.
- In 2012, the series also had a crossovers with Madhubala – Ek Ishq Ek Junoon and Sasural Simar Ka.
- In 2013, it had a crossover with Uttaran, where Mohan and Megha saved Ichcha.

== Adaptations ==
Language	Title	Original release	Networks	Last aired	Notes
Hindi	Na Bole Tum Na Maine Kuch Kaha ना बोले तुम ना मैंने कुछ कहा	9 January 2012	Colors TV	12 September 2013	Original
Marathi	Savar Re सावर रे	11 November 2013	Colors Marathi	18 May 2014	Remake
Tamil	Idhu Solla Marandha Kadhai இது சொல்ல மறந்த கதை	7 March 2022	Colors Tamil	23 September 2022	Remake
Telugu	Guvva Gorinka గువ్వ గోరింక	5 December 2022	ETV Telugu	2 November 2024	Remake

== Awards and nominations ==
Year	Award	Category	Recipient	Result	Ref.
2012	Golden Petal Awards	Most Nanhe Natkhat Personality	Ashnoor Kaur	Won	
2012	Gold Awards	Debut in a Lead Role - Female	Aakanksha Singh	Nominated	
2012	Indian Telly Awards	Fresh New Face - Female	Aakanksha Singh	Won	
2013	Indian Telly Awards	Best Child Artiste - Female	Ashnoor Kaur	Nominated	
2013	Indian Telly Awards	Best Actor in a Lead Role	Kunal Karan Kapoor	Won	
2013	Indian Television Academy Awards	Best Actor Popular	Kunal Karan Kapoor	Nominated	
2013	Indian Television Academy Awards	Best Child Artist	Ashnoor Kaur	Nominated	
