= Neeyat (2023 film) =

2023 Indian film by Anu Menon

- Theatrical release poster
- Directed by: Anu Menon
- Written by: Anu Menon; Girvani Dhyani; Advaita Kala; Priya Venkataraman
- Produced by: Vikram Malhotra
- Starring: Vidya Balan; Ram Kapoor; Rahul Bose; Dipannita Sharma; Shashank Arora; Shahana Goswami; Neeraj Kabi; Amrita Puri; Danesh Razvi; Prajakta Koli
- Cinematography: Andreas Neo
- Edited by: Adam Moss
- Music by: Mickey McCleary
- Production companies: Abundantia Entertainment; Amazon Studios
- Distributed by: Pen Marudhar Entertainment
- Release date: 7 July 2023
- Running time: 130 minutes
- Country: India
- Language: Hindi
- Box office: ₹5.50 crore

Neeyat (transl. Motive) is a 2023 Indian Hindi-language mystery film directed by Anu Menon. The film is produced by Vikram Malhotra under Abundantia Entertainment alongside Amazon Studios. It stars Vidya Balan with an ensemble cast including Ram Kapoor, Rahul Bose, Dipannita Sharma, Shashank Arora, Shahana Goswami, Neeraj Kabi and Amrita Puri. The film was released theatrically on 7 July 2023 to mixed reviews from critics.

== Plot ==
Ashish Kapoor (AK) (Ram Kapoor) is an Indian businessman who lost 20,000 crore Rupees in his dream company and fled from India to avoid being incarcerated. His company had over 10,000 employees whose salaries had not been paid for over 2 years. AK owns a castle in Scotland, where he is throwing a birthday party, and invited his close friends and family: AK's secretary, Kamini Deb Patel (Kay), (Amrita Puri) who has a massive crush on AK and is willing to do anything for him. Jimmy Mistry (Rahul Bose) is AK's brother-in-law who is spiteful of AK as Mistry's father selected AK as his successor to his company but also has a crush on him. AK's son, Ryan, (Shashank Arora) who was severely neglected in his childhood and is now a drug addict who despises his father. In a fit of rage and revenge, Ryan brings his mysterious girlfriend Gigi (Prajakta Koli) wearing a yellow dress belonging to his late mother, to shock AK and trigger him to confess his past crime. Noor, (Dipannita Sharma), an ex-actress who was AK's former love interest and is now married to Dr. Sanjay Suri (Neeraj Kabi). The couple are debt-ridden as Suri has lost his medical license and are now overwhelmed by AK's favours for them. AK's confidante and therapist Zara (Niki Aneja Walia), AK's current girlfriend Lisa (Shahana Goswami) and Lisa's cousin Sasha are other guests at the party.

During a surprise party thrown by him for his friends, a chandelier crash falls on AK - almost killing him. Then arrives CBI Officer, Meera Rao (Vidya Balan), and AK announces to his friends and family that he will be surrendering himself to the Government of India, leaving the group in shock.

A series of events then take place. In a heated discussion between Ryan and AK, AK storms out of the castle with Meera chasing after him. Meera is then knocked unconscious with a shovel by someone unknown. The group of people chase after AK who jumps off the cliff. Zara confirms seeing AK jumping from the cliff. Meera takes over the investigation. One thing leads to another and more murders follow. Meera searches everyone's rooms, interrogates them and gathers clues linking everyone of them to one or the other murder in some way or other. All these people have a motive to kill AK in some way or the other. A lot of confusion followed by some confessions reveal how every single person in the castle had a motive to kill. Meera finds out what really conspired behind the multiple murders. The final twist in the tale reveals the truth.

== Cast ==
- Vidya Balan as Mira Rao
- Ram Kapoor as Ashish Kapoor (AK)
- Rahul Bose as Jamshed "Jimmy" Mistry, AK's brother in law
- Dipannita Sharma as Noor Suri, AK's former love interest
- Neeraj Kabi as Dr. Sanjay "Sanju" Suri, AK's friend and Noor's husband
- Madhav Deval as Ishaan Suri, Noor's and Sanju's son
- Shahana Goswami as Lisa, AK's girlfriend
- Amrita Puri as Kamini Deb Patel (Kay), AK's assistant
- Shashank Arora as Ryan Kapoor, AK's stepson
- Prajakta Koli as Gigi, Ryan's girlfriend aka Cub Kumar
- Niki Aneja Walia as Zara, AK's fortune teller aka Simrat Kaur
- Danesh Razvi as Tanveer, event manager AKA Tanmay Shah, undercover news reporter
- Ishika Mehra as Sasha, AK's niece
- Supreet Bedi as Devika Chellam, AK industries' employee and Mira's girlfriend
- Shefali Shah as Mira Rao

== Production ==
The film was partly shot at Dunbeath Castle on the east coast of Caithness, Scotland.

== Release ==
=== Theatrical ===
The film's official teaser was released on 21 June 2023, and they officially announced the release date for the film on 7 July 2023.

=== Home media ===
The film was premiered on Amazon Prime Video from 1 September 2023.

== Reception ==
Neeyat received mixed reviews from critics.

On the review aggregator website Rotten Tomatoes, 33% of 9 critics' reviews are positive, with an average rating of 5.3/10.

Bhavna Agarwal from India Today rated it as 2.5 out of 5 stars and Dhaval Roy of The Times of India gave it 3 stars out of 5. Bollywood Hungama gave it 2 stars out 5.
