= Breathe (TV series) =

- Promotional poster
- Genre: Crime; Drama; Thriller
- Story by: Mayank Sharma; Abhijeet Deshpande
- Directed by: Mayank Sharma
- Starring: R. Madhavan; Amit Sadh; Atharva Vishwakarma
- Music by: Alokananda Dasgupta
- Country of origin: India
- Original language: Hindi
- No. of seasons: 1
- No. of episodes: 8

Production
- Executive producer: Vikram Malhotra
- Camera setup: S. Bharathwaj
- Running time: 36-60 minutes
- Production company: Abundantia Entertainment

Original release
- Network: Amazon Video
- Release: 26 January 2018

Related
- Breathe : Into the Shadows

Breathe is an Indian crime drama thriller television series. It premiered on Amazon Video on 26 January 2018. It is Amazon Prime Video’s second Indian original series after 2017's Inside Edge. The series stars R. Madhavan, Amit Sadh, Hrishikesh Joshi, Sapna Pabbi, Atharva Vishwakarma and Neena Kulkarni. The sequel series starring Abhishek Bachchan is called Breathe: Into the Shadows and debuted on July 10, 2020.

== Plot ==
Two desperate and driven men must engage in the ultimate cat and mouse game to save the one they love. A dying kid and endless killings. What might one do for the one they love.

== Cast ==
- R. Madhavan as Denzel "Danny" Mascarenhas
- Amit Sadh as Senior Inspector Kabir Sawant
- Sapna Pabbi as Ria Ganguly
- Neena Kulkarni as Juliet Mascarenhas
- Atharva Vishwakarma as Joshua "Josh" Mascarenhas
- Hrishikesh Joshi as Junior Inspector Prakash Kamble
- Shriswara as Dr. Aruna Sharma
- Shrikant Yadav as Malwankar
- Urmila Kanitkar as Margaret Mascarenhas
- Madhura Naik as Shaina
- Kali Prasad Mukherjee as Shankar Patil
- Jayashree Venketaramanan as Anita Sahani
- Anuj Sachdeva as Sameer

== Episodes ==
No.	Title	Directed by	Written by	Original release date
1	"The Promise"	Mayank Sharma	Mayank Sharma, Abhijeet Deshpande, Vikram Tuli	26 January 2018
Danny Mascarenhas, a charismatic football coach, lives with his young son, Josh and elderly mother, Juliet in Mumbai. He becomes desperate to save Josh, who has weak lungs, after learning that his son only has five months to live unless they find a donor. At the moment, Josh is number four on the recipient list. A desperate Danny breaks into the doctor's office and steals the confidential patients' list. Meanwhile, Kabir Sawant, a young alcoholic police officer, is still mourning the death of his daughter. His estranged wife, Ria has moved on and tries to convince him to sell their apartment but fails.
2	"The Hunt Begins"	Mayank Sharma	Mayank Sharma, Abhijeet Deshpande, Vikram Tuli	26 January 2018
Danny starts dating Aruna Sharma, Josh's divorcee doctor, in order to covertly get more information on how to carry out his plan to save his son. At around the same time, Kabir is invited to his partner, Prakash Kamble's anniversary dinner party where things get awkward when he reveals that he is getting a divorce. The following day, Danny tracks down one of the donors higher than Josh on the list; an elderly retired professor in another part of the city. After breaking into the man's apartment, Danny tries to kill him by triggering his asthma. However, the man does not die but merely goes into a coma.
3	"Safety First"	Mayank Sharma	Mayank Sharma, Abhijeet Deshpande, Vikram Tuli	26 January 2018
After failing to kill the retired professor, Danny moves on to a different target, Rahul, a young man working at an office building who is a registered organ donor. Meanwhile, Kabir attends a farewell dinner party for his boss. Ria also attends the party with Sameer, her co-worker at her art gallery, making Kabir jealous. That same night, Danny hides Rahul's helmet and then crashes into his motorcycle, ultimately killing him by making it look like a road accident. He then leaves the helmet by the body. Kabir then learns that Rahul could not have rode his bike without his helmet since he was obsessed with safety. Although Rahul's helmet was found by his side, he did not leave his office wearing it, which raises some questions.
4	"The Audition"	Mayank Sharma	Mayank Sharma, Abhijeet Deshpande, Vikram Tuli	26 January 2018
Danny's next target is a young aspiring actress named Anita. He pretends to be an assistant director and has Anita do an audition by pretending to commit suicide. As she suffocates to death, Danny allows her to die as he leaves her apartment. Kabir's new superior finds out he is hiding black money taken during a raid. While investigating both Rahul and Anita's deaths, Kabir realizes they are both not only of the same rare blood group, but are registered organ donors. As Prakash shortlists the organ donors, he realizes the serial killer's next possible target is Ria.
5	"Bad Fish"	Mayank Sharma	Mayank Sharma, Abhijeet Deshpande, Vikram Tuli	2 February 2018
Kabir tries to warn Ria that her life is in danger but she does not believe him. Meanwhile, Aruna gets a promising job offer in Australia and asks Danny to migrate with her after they are married. Later that night, Danny breaks into Ria's home to kill her but is interrupted by her mother. Unknown to anyone, Kabir and Prakash are watching her home at the gate. They see Danny leaving and try to chase him down. However, Danny manages to outrun the drunk Kabir. Seeing that Ria is untouchable, Danny goes back to kill his first victim, the retired professor. He induces a heart attack and gets warded alongside the old man at the ICU, where he forces him into a brain dead condition. Back home, he finds that Kabir and Prakash are questioning his family.
6	"Blind Man's Bluff"	Mayank Sharma	Mayank Sharma, Abhijeet Deshpande, Vikram Tuli	9 February 2018
Danny begins to realize that he is Kabir's prime suspect. Prakash has some of their men follow Danny. Meanwhile, Aruna finds out Danny was warded at the ICU under a different name the night the retired professor went brain dead. To her surprise, Josh immediately rises up to the first place on the recipient's list. Danny's next target is a wealthy middle-aged man, Nair. He tricks Prakash's man by misleading them into thinking he is spending the night volunteering at a blind school. However, he somehow manages to sneak into Nair's country club, cuts off the electricity and drowns Nair while the man is at the swimming pool.
7	"It's in the Eyes"	Mayank Sharma	Mayank Sharma, Abhijeet Deshpande, Vikram Tuli	16 February 2018
Nair is in critical condition at the hospital. Frustrated that he could not catch Danny in the act, Kabir attacks Danny at the blind school. Later that night, Danny pushes Aruna towards an oncoming car that kills her when she confronts him about killing the organ donors. Kabir gets a hold of a recording of Nair's phone conversation with his wife before he drowned when he was interrupted by an unknown person. After playing the recording multiple times, Kabir and Prakash determine that it is Rao, the elderly husband of another patient whom they earlier cleared as a suspect. This is confirmed by a security camera recording that shows Rao entering and leaving Nair's country club. Kabir beats the man up into confessing and arrests him. After meeting with Ria, Kabir calls up Danny to apologize before leaving for a short break outside the city.
8	"Body Parts"	Mayank Sharma	Mayank Sharma, Abhijeet Deshpande, Vikram Tuli	23 February 2018
Juliet finds out Danny's secret while cleaning up his garage and asks him to dispose of anything that might incriminate him. He tells Josh that after his surgery, they will move to Australia to start a new life there. Danny makes his move on Ria by pretending to be an art enthusiast at her gallery. Before he can make his next move, the hospital informs him that a donor had died and Josh can be operated on immediately. However, the doctors learn that the donor was a smoker and his lungs were damaged, so stopped the surgery to avoid future complications. Desperate to see his son healthy, Danny breaks into Ria's gallery to kill her but is stopped by Kabir who knew Danny had Rao framed since the Rao on the security camera footage did not have a tattoo. While arresting Danny, he infuriates Kabir by mocking him for being a bad father, leading Kabir to mortally shoot Danny. Nair who had not died and was on a ventilator does not make it. Kabir does not order for an autopsy and thus allows Nair's organs to be donated to Josh. Kabir and Prakash cover up the crime in order to prevent the public from fearing organ donation. Josh's surgery is a success and he lives. In a flash-forward, Juliet, Kabir, and Ria are seen attending a sports meet at Josh's school.

== Sequel ==
A follow-up titled Breathe: Into the Shadows starring Amit Sadh, Abhishek Bachchan and Nithya Menen premiered on Amazon Prime Video on July 10, 2020.

== Reception ==
Writing in Hindustan Times, Rohan Naahar states, "Madhavan and Amazon have created the single weirdest show on TV right now, like an adaptation of one of Keigo Higashino’s least popular novels directed by an Anurag Kashyap minion."

Writing in Scroll.in, Vikram Johri wrote, "Viewers may have trouble accepting Madhavan as a cold-blooded killer – his soft features do not help – but to the actor’s credit, he is able to walk the contrast between tender and merciless with admirable finesse."

Shivangi Jalan, a critic from The Indian Express wrote, "The first three episodes become a particularly slow watch. Even the scenes where Sadh and Madhavan appear together fail to carry the kind of weight a thriller is supposed to."
