= Devendra Pratap Singh =

Devendra Pratap Singh is an Indian male name and may refer to:

- Devendra Pratap Singh (UP politician, born 1954), member of the Uttar Pradesh Legislative Council for Gorakhpur-Faizabaad Graduates
- Devendra Pratap Singh (UP politician, born 1958), member of the Uttar Pradesh Legislative Assembly for Sareni
- Devendra Pratap Singh (Chhattisgarh politician) (born 1975)

== See also ==
- Devendra Singh (disambiguation)
- Pratap Singh (disambiguation)
