= Breathe: Into the Shadows =

Indian television series

- Promotional poster
- Genre: Crime; Drama; Thriller
- Created by: Mayank Sharma
- Screenplay by: Bhavani Iyer; Vikram Tuli; Mayank Sharma
- Story by: Mayank Sharma; Vikram Tuli
- Directed by: Mayank Sharma
- Starring: Abhishek Bachchan; Amit Sadh; Nithya Menen; Saiyami Kher; Hrishikesh Joshi; Shrikant Verma; Plabita Borthakur; Ivana Kaur; Shruti Bapna
- Music by: Alokananda Dasgupta
- Country of origin: India
- Original language: Hindi
- No. of seasons: 2
- No. of episodes: 20

Production
- Executive producer: Vikram Malhotra
- Camera setup: S. Bharathwaj
- Running time: 45 minutes
- Production company: Abundantia Entertainment

Original release
- Network: Amazon Prime Video
- Release: 10 July 2020

Related
- Breathe (TV series)

Breathe: Into the Shadows is an Indian crime drama thriller television series created and directed by Mayank Sharma and produced by Abundantia Entertainment for Amazon Prime Video. The series stars Abhishek Bachchan, Amit Sadh, and Nithya Menen in lead roles. Season 1 of the series premiered on 10 July 2020. The second season was released on 9 November 2022.

== Synopsis ==
Dr. Avinash Sabharwal (Bachchan) finds his 6-year-old daughter Siya kidnapped by a masked man. The kidnapper demands that Sabharwal kills a man in order to get his daughter back. The plot revolves around the lengths Avinash will go to save his daughter.

== Cast ==
- Abhishek Bachchan as Dr. Avinash Sabharwal/ J
- Amit Sadh as Kabir Sawant
- Nithya Menen as Abha Sabharwal
- Ivana Kaur as Siya Sabharwal
- Shrikant Verma as Jaiprakash
- Saiyami Kher as Shirley
- Plabita Borthakur as Meghna Verma
- Hrishikesh Joshi as Prakash Kamble
- Shradha Kaul as Zeba Rizvi
- Shruti Bapna as Natasha Garewal
- Resham Shrivardhan as Gayatri Mishra
- Shataf Figar as Dr. Narang
- Nizhalgal Ravi as Principal Krishnan Moorthy (cameo appearance)
- Gouri Agarwal as Bonnie

== Episodes ==
=== Season 1 ===
No.	Title	Directed by	Written by	Original release date
1	"Papa's Princess"	Mayank Sharma	Screenplay: Bhavani Iyer, Vikram Tuli, Mayank Sharma; Dialogues: Arshad Syed	10 July 2020
2	"Filthy"	Mayank Sharma	Screenplay: Bhavani Iyer, Vikram Tuli, Mayank Sharma; Dialogues: Arshad Syed	10 July 2020
3	"Wings and Chains"	Mayank Sharma	Screenplay: Bhavani Iyer, Vikram Tuli, Mayank Sharma; Dialogues: Arshad Syed	10 July 2020
4	"Mind Games"	Mayank Sharma	Screenplay: Bhavani Iyer, Vikram Tuli, Mayank Sharma; Dialogues: Arshad Syed	10 July 2020
5	"Reflection"	Mayank Sharma	Screenplay: Bhavani Iyer, Vikram Tuli, Mayank Sharma; Dialogues: Arshad Syed	10 July 2020
6	"Turning Point"	Mayank Sharma	Screenplay: Bhavani Iyer, Vikram Tuli, Mayank Sharma; Dialogues: Arshad Syed	10 July 2020
7	"Relay Race"	Mayank Sharma	Screenplay: Bhavani Iyer, Vikram Tuli, Mayank Sharma; Dialogues: Arshad Syed	10 July 2020
8	"Bad Uncle"	Mayank Sharma	Screenplay: Bhavani Iyer, Vikram Tuli, Mayank Sharma; Dialogues: Arshad Syed	10 July 2020
9	"Lights Out"	Mayank Sharma	Screenplay: Bhavani Iyer, Vikram Tuli, Mayank Sharma; Dialogues: Arshad Syed	10 July 2020
10	"1996"	Mayank Sharma	Screenplay: Bhavani Iyer, Vikram Tuli, Mayank Sharma; Dialogues: Arshad Syed	10 July 2020
11	"Chef's Special"	Mayank Sharma	Screenplay: Bhavani Iyer, Vikram Tuli, Mayank Sharma; Dialogues: Arshad Syed	10 July 2020
12	"C-16"	Mayank Sharma	Screenplay: Bhavani Iyer, Vikram Tuli, Mayank Sharma; Dialogues: Arshad Syed	10 July 2020

== Production ==
The series was officially announced in late 2018, attaching Abhishek Bachchan and Saiyami Kher to star and Amit Sadh from the original series returning as Kabir Sawant. Nithya Menen joined the cast in December 2018.

== Release ==
Season 1 premiered on 10 July 2020 on Amazon Prime Video. Season 2 was released on 9 November 2022.

== Reception ==
Rohan Nahaar writing for Hindustan Times called the series "Inept and illogical, [and says] Amazon’s strangest show lets Abhishek Bachchan, Amit Sadh down." Shubhra Gupta writing for Indian Express said "Somewhere in there, in all the roiling and toiling, are the bones of a crackerjack thriller. But this loosely written season 2, bouncing in and out of a kidnapping drama, and the creation and search of a psychotic killer, gets mired in its own muddles, and ends up being plain preposterous." Saibal Chatterjee writing for NDTV called the series "low On oxygen", giving it 1.5 of 5.
