= Beend Banoongaa Ghodi Chadhunga =

- Genre: Soap opera
- Created by: S Farhan
- Written by: S Farhan; Amit Senchoudhary; Shobhit Jaiswal
- Directed by: Hemant Prabhou; Inder Das; Ravi Raj
- Creative director: Nimisha Pandey
- Starring: See below
- Theme music composer: Lalit Sen
- Opening theme: "Beend Banoongaa Ghodi Chadhunga"
- Country of origin: India
- Original language: Hindi
- No. of seasons: 1
- No. of episodes: 195

Production
- Producer: S Farhan
- Camera setup: Multi-camera
- Running time: approximately 24 minutes
- Production companies: Endemol India; Fortune Productions

Original release
- Network: Imagine TV
- Release: 28 March 2011 – 24 February 2012

Beend Banoongaa Ghodi Chadhunga is an Indian television series which aired on Imagine TV from 28 March 2011 to 24 February 2012. It is based on the story of two people who get caught up in the web of strong traditions. The show is set in Jaipur.

== Plot ==
Jai is the youngest son of the wealthy and traditional Poddar family. He goes through life like a dream. One day, he sees Sarika and falls in love with her. He dreams of marrying her. Sarika doesn't know Jai and hasn't even seen him. All Sarika wants is to be is a doctor. However, in Marwari families, the women stay at home to look after their households while the men go out to work. So, Sarika's grandmother is against the young woman becoming a doctor and wants her married off as soon as possible. On one side is Jai, pining for Sarika, and on the other side, is Sarika, with her dreams of being a doctor and no foreseeable plan of getting married.

Eventually, Jai and Sarika get married with the blessings of both their families. But the Poddars are against Sarika's further education. She has to overcome their reservations in order to get enrolled in medical college.

As she starts going to college, many problems crop up within her in-laws' family. The discussions of this by their neighbors, relatives, family friends and employees of their business embarrass them. This embarrassment starts to change their minds. They give Sarika three months to prove that she can balance studies and family. However, this is not the only hurdle Sarika has to face. One of her college professors is hostile to her and tries everything possible to make her leave the course. In the end, all is settled, and Sarika completes her degree, thus realizing her dream of becoming a doctor.

== Cast ==
- Jayashree Venketaramanan as Sarika Poddar
- Anuj Thakur / Naman Shaw as Jai Poddar
- Rishika Mihani as Komal
- Nausheen Ali Sardar as Santosh Poddar
- Rucha Gujarathi as Meera
- Shaleen Bhanot as Mihir
- Ashish Kapoor as Jijaji
- Sahil Chaddha / Gaurav Khanna as Mr. Poddar (Jai's father)
- Khyaati Khandke Keswani as Laxmi
- Himani Shivpuri as Sarika's grandmother
- Neena Cheema as Mrs. Poddar (Jai's grandmother)
- Mukesh Rawal as Mr. Poddar (Jai's grandfather)
- Amrin Chakkiwala as Taruna
- Ankit Arora as Chandan Poddar
- Akshay Anand as Mr. Poddar (Jai's paternal uncle)
- Archana Taide as Panvi
- Sandit Tiwari as Rakesh

== Characters and themes ==
Sarika, a middle-class young woman, wants to become a doctor. Jai, a wealthy young man, is happy sitting on the counter of his father's spice business outlet, with no aim and ambition of his own.

Sarika has traditional values at heart and wants to strike a balance between home and her dreams. She believes that she would make a great homemaker as well as a doctor. Under family pressure Sarika is forced to marry Jai just when her medical entrance exam results are declared. Sarika feels that marriage would be the biggest hindrance in her path of becoming a doctor. However, as the marriage takes place and Sarika joins Jai's house, he becomes the biggest supporter of her dreams.

As we see the journey of this married young woman going to college every day, there is a conflict at home: For a conservative Marwari family, a daughter-in-law going to college is not their way of life. The one person who stands with her all through is her husband Jai.

Jai, a high school dropout himself, starts respecting education only after meeting Sarika. He realizes the meaning of ambition and focus in life through her. And in Jai, Sarika finds the man who surely loves her most in the world and would do anything for her.

Set against a backdrop of a conservative Marwari family with staunch beliefs and rigid norms, BBGC is a tale of how Jai will help Sarika live her dreams in the midst of family protests.
