= The Jengaburu Curse =

Cli-fi series on Sony LIV

- Genre: Climate fiction
- Created by: Nila Madhab Panda
- Written by: Nila Madhab Panda; Mayank Tewari
- Directed by: Nila Madhab Panda
- Starring: Faria Abdullah; M Nassar; Makrand Deshpande; Sudev Nair
- Music by: Alokananda Dasgupta
- Country of origin: India
- Original language: Hindi
- No. of seasons: 1
- No. of episodes: 7

Production
- Producer: Indranil Chakraborty
- Cinematography: Paulo Perez
- Editor: Jabeen Merchant
- Running time: 46 minutes
- Production company: Studio NEXT

Original release
- Network: SonyLIV
- Release: 9 August 2023

The Jengaburu Curse is a 2023 Indian climate fiction series streaming on SonyLIV. The series is directed by Nila Madhab Panda, shot by DOP Paulo Perez, and produced by the Studio NEXT division of Culver Max Entertainment Private Limited.

It features Faria Abdullah, M Nassar, Makrand Deshpande, Deepak Sampat, and Sudev Nair in lead roles, along with Melanie Gray, Charlie Allen, Sabrina Nabi, and Mark Adams. The series is shot in Odisha and London.

The series was launched on 9 August 2023 on SonyLIV.

== Synopsis ==
The show is a climate fiction thriller that delves into the exploitation of natural resources for mankind's never-ending needs, resulting in harmful consequences. A sudden call brings Priya, a financial analyst from London, back to Odisha. A series of strange events follow as she sets out on the hunt for her missing father, Prof. Das, an activist jailed for 3 years for siding with an indigenous tribe Bondria(fictional) from Kendujhar district Odisha. In the backdrop of bauxite mining, displaced tribals, and a missing father, Priya finds connections between London, Pyongyang and the mining state of Odisha and a very unethical nexus between Police, Bureaucracy, Corporation, White-collar crime and Juche.

== Cast ==
- Faria Abdullah as Priyamvada Das "Priya"
- Sudev Nair as Dhruv Kanan IAS
- M Nassar as Ravichandran Rao / Dr.Jayanth Subramanyam
- Makrand Deshpande as Dr. Panigrahi
- Deepak Sampat as Kadey
- Melanie Gray as Beatrice
- R. Bhakti Klein as Special Officer Henry Stout
- Aarya Bhatta as Prabal Banerjee
- R Badree as Srinivas
- Shrikant Verma as ACP Padhi
- Hitesh Yogesh Dave as CM Tigga
- Maninee De as Lata Panigrahi
- Pavitra Sarkar as Professor Das
- Sukumar Tudu as Ram Kumar
- Satya Ranjan as Tobu
- Tushar Acharya as Nattu

== Episodes ==
=== Episodic Synopsis ===
Episode 1: Homecoming

Priya Das rushes back to India from London after learning of the disappearance of Prof. Das, her father. Ravichandran Rao escorts her to identify a corpse, which she recognizes as not her father. However, she discovers that it’s not just Prof. Das; her entire tribe has gone missing.

Episode 2: Missing People

Following Man Singh's tragic death, Priya discovers an unexpected clue in a few medical files belonging to Prof. Das. The documents indicate an outbreak of a mysterious illness in the Keonjhar district, with Jengaburu being the epicenter.

Episode 3: Dying Or Disappearing

After Prof. Das’s death, a grieving Priya is urged to leave Odisha immediately following her father’s funeral rites. But a question persists in her mind; what was her Baba investigating?

Episode 4: Where Do They Exist?

Priya, driven by her quest to investigate further, does not return to London and secretly joins forces with Beatrice. Together, they investigate the suspicious funding Dutta Mines received while suffering huge losses. Can they get to the bottom of these fraudulent activities?

Episode 5: Billion Dollar Curse

Amidst the puzzling death of a journalist and the ongoing money flow at Dutta Mines, Priya comes across a strange rock that she tries to get lab tested, which puts her life in grave danger. Can she find out the true secret of the rock?

Episode 6: Final Delivery

The authorities are on the hunt for Priya. She seeks refuge in the forest, where she learns there will be a delivery from the Mines. Will she find out more about the mystery?

Episode 7: The Red Mountain

The international funding for Dutta Mines leads to a London-based billionaire. As Priya and her Bondria allies try to make their way into the mines, the legend of Tamba Nagraj comes to life. They came to know that uranium lies under the mountains and Dutta Mines were trying to supply enriched uranium to North Korea. Finally, with the help of army, they succeeded to stop the delivery.

== See also ==
- Niyamgiri
