= Flower of Evil (South Korean TV series) =

2020 South Korean television series

- Promotional poster
- Hangul: 악의 꽃
- RR: Agui kkot
- MR: Agŭi kkot
- Genre: Romance; Mystery; Thriller
- Created by: Studio Dragon
- Written by: Yoo Jung-hee
- Directed by: Kim Cheol-kyu
- Starring: Lee Joon-gi; Moon Chae-won; Jang Hee-jin; Seo Hyun-woo
- Music by: Kim Joon-seok; Jeong Se-rin
- Country of origin: South Korea
- Original language: Korean
- No. of episodes: 16

Production
- Executive producer: Yoo Sang-won
- Producers: Jung Hae-ryong; Jang Shin-ae; Kim Dae-ho
- Editor: Kim Young-joo
- Running time: 61–79 minutes
- Production company: Monster Union

Original release
- Network: TVN
- Release: July 29 – September 23, 2020

Related
- Flower of Evil (Philippines); Duranga (India)

Flower of Evil (Korean: 악의 꽃) is a South Korean television series starring Lee Joon-gi, Moon Chae-won, Jang Hee-jin, and Seo Hyun-woo. It aired on tvN every Wednesday and Thursday from July 29 to September 23, 2020, and streamed internationally on Netflix, iQiyi, Viki and ViuTV with multi-languages subtitles. Lee and Moon have previously starred in Criminal Minds, and it was Lee's return to television after two years.

== Synopsis ==
Baek Hee-sung (Lee Joon-gi) is a man who hides his identity and past from his wife Cha Ji-won (Moon Chae-won), a detective. On the surface, they seem to be the perfect family with a six-year-old daughter who loves her parents. As Cha Ji-won being a detective she and her colleagues begin investigating a series of unexplained murders and she is confronted with the reality that her seemingly perfect husband may be hiding something from her.

== Cast ==
=== Main ===
- Lee Joon-gi as Baek Hee-sung/Do Hyun-soo
  - Park Hyun-joon as young Hyun-soo
  - Cha Sung-je as child Hyun-soo
- Moon Chae-won as Cha Ji-won, Hee-sung/Hyun-soo's wife
- Jang Hee-jin as Do Hae-soo
  - Lim Na-young as teenage Hae-soo, Hyun-soo's older sister
  - Lee Chae-yoon as eleven-year-old Hae-soo
- Seo Hyun-woo as Kim Moo-jin, journalist
  - Jeong Taek-hyun as young Moo-jin

=== Supporting ===
==== Baek Hee-sung and Cha Ji-won's family ====
- Jung Seo-yeon as Baek Eun-ha, daughter of Hee-sung and Ji-won
- Son Jong-hak as Baek Man-woo, Hee-sung's father
- Nam Gi-ae as Gong Mi-ja, Hee-sung's mother
- Jo Kyung-sook as Moon Young-ok, Ji-won's mother

==== Kangsoo Police Station ====
- Choi Dae-hoon as Lee Woo-cheol, leader of Homicide Investigation Team
- Choi Young-joon as Choi Jae-sub, veteran detective
- Kim Soo-oh as Im Ho-joon, youngest team member
- Lim Chul-hyung as Yoon Sang-pil, section chief
- Hong Seo-joon as Oh Young-joon, police captain

==== Hanjoogan Magazine ====
- Yang Hye-jin as Gang Pil-young, lead reporter
- Ju Ye-eun as Reporter Joo

=== Extended ===
- Choi Byung-mo as Do Min-seok, father of Hae-soo and Hyun-soo
- Kim Ji-hoon as Baek Hee-sung
  - Choi Kwon-soo as young Hee-sung
- Lee Kyu-bok as Nam Soon-gil
- Kim Geon as Kim In-seo
- Lee Ju-yeon as Park Seo-young
- Han Soo-yeon as Jung Mi-sook
- Yoon Byung-hee as Park Kyung-choon, taxi driver and husband of Jung Mi-sook
- Park Seung-tae as Oh Bok-ja
- Kim Ki-cheon as Dr. Lee Hyun-suk

== Original soundtrack ==
=== Part 1 ===
Released on August 6, 2020
No.	Title	Lyrics	Music	Artist	Length
1.	"Psycho"	DOKO, Son Jae-min	DOKO, Son Jae-min	DOKO	3:07
2.	"Psycho" (Inst.)		DOKO, Son Jae-min		3:07
Total length:					6:14

=== Part 2 ===
Released on August 19, 2020
No.	Title	Lyrics	Music	Artist	Length
1.	"In My Heart"	Kim Min	Kim Min	Lim Yeon	3:49
2.	"In My Heart" (Inst.)		Kim Min		3:49
Total length:					7:38

=== Part 3 ===
Released on September 3, 2020
No.	Title	Lyrics	Music	Artist	Length
1.	"Feel You"	Kim Min	Kim Min, Taylor	Shin Yong-jae (2F)	3:28
2.	"Feel You" (Inst.)		Kim Min, Taylor		3:28
Total length:					6:56

== Viewership ==
Flower of Evil : South Korea viewers per episode (thousands)

Season	Episode number																Average
Season	1	2	3	4	5	6	7	8	9	10	11	12	13	14	15	16	Average
1	806	640	752	912	752	797	932	937	803	851	887	1212	1092	1210	1212	1349	947

Source: Audience measurement performed nationwide by Nielsen Korea.

Average TV viewership ratings
Ep.	Original broadcast date	Average audience share (Nielsen Korea)	
Ep.	Original broadcast date	Nationwide	Seoul
1	July 29, 2020	3.357%	4.248%
2	July 30, 2020	2.860%	3.155%
3	August 5, 2020	3.116%	3.570%
4	August 6, 2020	3.735%	4.357%
5	August 12, 2020	2.973%	3.060%
6	August 13, 2020	3.615%	4.030%
7	August 19, 2020	3.526%	4.030%
8	August 20, 2020	3.863%	4.358%
9	August 26, 2020	3.539%	4.142%
10	August 27, 2020	3.659%	4.701%
11	September 2, 2020	3.844%	4.250%
12	September 9, 2020	4.729%	5.234%
13	September 10, 2020	4.456%	4.853%
14	September 16, 2020	4.767%	5.246%
15	September 17, 2020	5.083%	5.536%
16	September 23, 2020	5.715%	6.639%
Average		3.927%	4.463%
Special	September 3, 2020	2.342%	2.797%
In the table above, the blue numbers represent the lowest ratings and the red numbers represent the highest ratings.; This series aired on a cable channel/pay TV which normally has a relatively smaller audience compared to free-to-air TV/public broadcasters (KBS, SBS, MBC and EBS).

== Awards and nominations ==
Year	Award	Category	Recipient	Result	Ref.
2020	Asia Artist Awards	Asia Celebrity	Lee Joon-gi	Won	
2020	Asia Artist Awards	Best Artist Awards	Lee Joon-gi	Won	
2020	Asia Artist Awards	Popularity Award, Actress	Moon Chae-won	Nominated	
2021	7th APAN Star Awards	Popular Star Award, Actor	Lee Joon-gi	Nominated	
2021	7th APAN Star Awards	KT Seezn Star Award	Lee Joon-gi	Nominated	
2021	7th APAN Star Awards	KT Seezn Star Award	Moon Chae-won	Nominated	
2021	7th APAN Star Awards	Popularity Award, Actress	Moon Chae-won	Nominated	
2021	57th Baeksang Arts Awards	Best Director (TV)	Kim Cheol-kyu	Won	
2021	57th Baeksang Arts Awards	Best Drama (TV)	Flower of Evil	Nominated	
2021	57th Baeksang Arts Awards	Best Screenplay (TV)	Yoo Jung-hee	Nominated	
2021	57th Baeksang Arts Awards	Best Actor (TV)	Lee Joon-gi	Nominated	
2021	57th Baeksang Arts Awards	Best Supporting Actor (TV)	Kim Ji-hoon	Nominated	

== Adaptation ==
On September 16, 2021, ABS-CBN announced a Philippine remake for the series. It was released on Viu on June 23, 2022, along with its television broadcast on Kapamilya Channel and A2Z which premiered on June 25, 2022.

A Hindi remake titled Duranga is produced by Rose Audio Visuals with streaming partner ZEE5 after buying rights from Studio Dragon. The series premiered August 19, 2022. It is also the first official remake of a Korean drama in India. On August 23, 2023, a Chinese remake titled Deceit was announced.
