= Pratap Singh =

Pratap Singh, Partap Singh, Pratab Singh, Partab Singh, Pratapsingh, or Partapsingh is an Indian male given name and may refer to (in chronological order):

== Royalty with the name ==
=== Mewar ===
- Pratap Singh I of Mewar or Maharana Pratap (1540–1597)
- Pratap Singh II of Mewar (1724–1753)

=== Other royalty ===
- Pratap Singh of Thanjavur (1739–1763)
- Pratap Singh Shah of Nepal (1751-1777)
- Pratap Singh of Jaipur (1764–1803)
- Pratap Singh of Satara (1793–1847)
- Pratap Singh (Sikh prince) (1831–1843)
- Pratap Singh of Idar (1845–1922)
- Pratap Singh of Jammu and Kashmir (1848–1925)
- Pratap Singh Rao of Baroda (1908-1968)

== Others ==
- Pratap Singh of Kapurthala (1871–1911), Punjabi politician and scholar
- Pratap Singh Giani (1855-1920), Sikh academic
- Partap Singh Kairon (1901-1965), Chief Minister of Punjab, India
- Pratap Singh (Shimla) (1912-1975), Indian politician
- Partap Singh (1904–1984), Sikh priest and Jathedar of Akal Takht
- Pratap Singh Nabha (1919–1995), Maharaja of Nabha, India, 1928–1995
- Pratap Singh (Rajasthan politician) (in office 1951-1956), member of the Rajasthan Legislative Assembly
- Vishwanath Pratap Singh (1931-2008), Indian prime minister from 1989 to 1990
- Pratapsingh Rane (born 1939), Indian politician
- Partap Singh Bajwa (born 1957), Indian politician
- Pratap Singh (Madhya Pradesh politician) (born 1961)
- Pratap Singh (referee) (born 1971), Indian football referee
- Pratap Singh (cricketer) (born 1993), Indian cricketer

== See also ==
- Pratapa-simha, a character in the 11th-century Indian story collection Shringara-manjari-katha
- Devendra Pratap Singh (disambiguation)
