= Amrita Puri =

Indian actress (born 1983)

- Puri in 2026
- Born: 20 August 1983 (age 43); Mumbai, Maharashtra, India
- Occupation: Actress
- Years active: 2005–present
- Notable work: Aisha; Blood Money; Kai Po Che!; Four More Shots Please!; Jeet Ki Zid
- Parent: Aditya Puri (father)

Amrita Puri (born 20 August 1983) is an Indian actress who mainly works in Hindi films and web shows. She made her acting debut with the romantic comedy-drama Aisha (2010), which earned her the Stardust Award for Breakthrough Performance – Female and also received Filmfare Award nomination for Best Supporting Actress. She had her first commercial success with the 2013 buddy sports drama Kai Po Che!.

Puri received ITA Award for Best Actress Drama nomination, for her portrayal in the television show P.O.W. - Bandi Yuddh Ke (2016-2017). She has since appeared in the web series, Four More Shots Please! (2019), Jeet Ki Zid (2021), Ranjish Hi Sahi (2022) and the film Neeyat (2023).

== Early life ==
Amrita Puri was born on Saturday, 20 August 1983 in Mumbai. Her father Aditya Puri is a former MD of HDFC Bank. She has a brother named Amit Puri. She said in an interview that after her graduation, her father made her work with O&M as a copywriter for a year.

== Career ==
Puri began exploring acting through theatre while attending college, participating in professional stage productions. After completing her studies in mass communication, she worked as a copywriter at Ogilvy & Mather before pursuing acting professionally. Having previously appeared in advertisements and theatre productions, she made her Hindi film debut in Rajshree Ojha's romantic comedy-drama Aisha (2010), an adaptation of Jane Austen's novel Emma.

Her performance in Aisha earned her the Stardust Award for Breakthrough Performance – Female in 2011. She also received nominations for Best Female Debut and Best Supporting Actress at the 56th Filmfare Awards, alongside nominations at the Screen Awards and Zee Cine Awards.

Puri subsequently appeared opposite Kunal Khemu in Vishal Mahadkar's crime thriller Blood Money (2012), portraying Arzoo Kadam. In 2013, she played Vidya Bhatt in Abhishek Kapoor's drama Kai Po Che!, alongside Sushant Singh Rajput, Rajkummar Rao and Amit Sadh. The film was adapted from Chetan Bhagat's novel The 3 Mistakes of My Life.

Puri made her television debut in Stories by Rabindranath Tagore (2015), an anthology series adapting the works of the Bengali writer. This was followed by Nikkhil Advani's television drama P.O.W. – Bandi Yuddh Ke (2016–2017), broadcast on Star Plus. Puri portrayed Harleen Kaur, one of the series' central characters.

In 2019, Puri appeared in two streaming productions. She portrayed Kavya Arora in the Amazon Prime Video comedy-drama series Four More Shots Please!, appearing across multiple seasons of the series.

She also played Devyani Singh in the first season of Made in Heaven, a drama centred on a wedding-planning business in Delhi. That year, she appeared in the Hindi film Judgementall Hai Kya.

Puri continued working across film and digital platforms, portraying Jaya Singh in the drama series Jeet Ki Zid (2021). She also appeared in Clean (2021), a short film directed by Zoya Parvin and released on Amazon miniTV, alongside Aisha Ahmed.

In 2022, she portrayed Anju Bhatt in Pushpdeep Bhardwaj's drama series Ranjish Hi Sahi, alongside Tahir Raj Bhasin and Amala Paul.

In 2023, she appeared in Anu Menon's mystery thriller Neeyat, playing Kay, an assistant to a businessman whose death becomes the subject of an investigation.

In 2024, Puri appeared in the Netflix miniseries IC 814: The Kandahar Hijack, directed by Anubhav Sinha. Based on the 1999 hijacking of Indian Airlines Flight 814, the series featured Puri as Nandini Martin, a journalist reporting on the unfolding crisis.

== Academic and professional work ==
Alongside her acting career, Puri pursued postgraduate studies at the University of Edinburgh, earning a master's degree in Global Mental Health and Society. Her academic interests include mental health and employee well-being.

She has also worked as an employee well-being consultant, focusing on workplace mental health and organisational approaches to employee well-being.

In March 2026, Puri authored an article in Mint titled "Why yoga mats and mindfulness apps are no match for the structural stress of a toxic work culture". The article examined the relationship between organisational structures and employee mental health, arguing that workplace well-being initiatives must address systemic factors, including excessive working hours and organisational culture.

== Personal life ==
Puri developed an interest in literature and acting during her early years and participated in theatre productions during college. After graduating, she worked as a copywriter at the advertising agency Ogilvy & Mather before deciding to pursue acting professionally. Her father, Aditya Puri, was initially reluctant about her entering the film industry but eventually supported her career choice. In a 2013 interview, Puri discussed her interests outside acting, including travelling, watching films, reading and painting. She also spoke about her involvement in theatre and her approach to selecting film roles. In a 2021 interview, she discussed personal interests and experiences while reflecting on her work in the television series Jeet Ki Zid.

== Filmography ==
Key
†	Denotes films that have not yet been released

=== Films ===
Year	Title	Role	Notes	Ref.
2010	Aisha	Shefali Thakur		
2012	Blood Money	Aarzoo Kadam		
2013	Kai Po Che!	Vidya Bhatt Patel		
2019	Judgementall Hai Kya	Megha Kumar		
2019	Suno	Wife	Short film	
2021	Clean	Maeher Saluja	Short film	
2023	Neeyat	Kamini Deb Patel (Kay)		

=== Television ===
Year	Title	Role	Notes	Ref.
2015	Stories by Rabindranath Tagore	Charulata	Episode: "Broken Nest"	
2016-2017	P.O.W. - Bandi Yuddh Ke	Harleen Kaur		

=== Web series ===
Year	Title	Role	Notes	Ref.
2019–present	Four More Shots Please!	Kavya Arora	3 seasons	
2019	Made in Heaven	Devyani Singh	Episode: "A Royal Affair"	
2020	Mentalhood	Anjali Patel		
2021	Jeet Ki Zid	Jaya Singh		
2022	Ranjish Hi Sahi	Anju Bhatt		
2024	IC 814: The Kandahar Hijack	Nandini Martin		

== Awards and nominations ==
Year	Award	Category	Work	Result	Ref.
2011	56th Filmfare Awards	Best Supporting Actress	Aisha	Nominated	
2011	56th Filmfare Awards	Best Female Debut	Aisha	Nominated	
2011	Screen Awards	Best Supporting Actress	Aisha	Nominated	
2011	Stardust Awards	Breakthrough Performance – Female	Aisha	Won	
2011	Zee Cine Awards	Best Actor in a Supporting Role – Female	Aisha	Nominated	
2017	Indian Television Academy Awards	Best Actress - Drama	P.O.W. - Bandi Yuddh Ke	Nominated	
