= Loyola Academy, Secunderabad =

Private Catholic minority higher education institution in India

Coordinates: 17.502613°N 78.483807°E

Loyola Academy
- Motto: Wisdom, Truth, Service.
- Type: Private Catholic
- Established: 1976; 50 years ago
- Founders: Rev Fr T. Baliah, SJ
- Accreditation: UGC (CPE), NAAC 'A' grade
- Religious affiliation: Roman Catholic (Jesuit)
- Rector: Rev. Fr. Chiluvuru Amar Rao SJ
- Principal: Rev Fr Dr L. Joji Reddy SJ
- Faculty: 283
- Administrative staff: 80
- Location: Old Alwal, Manjeera Colony, Spring Fields Colony, JEEDIMETLA, Secunderabad, Telangana, India
- Campus: Urban 132 acres (53.4 ha)
- Website: www.loyolaacademy.edu.in

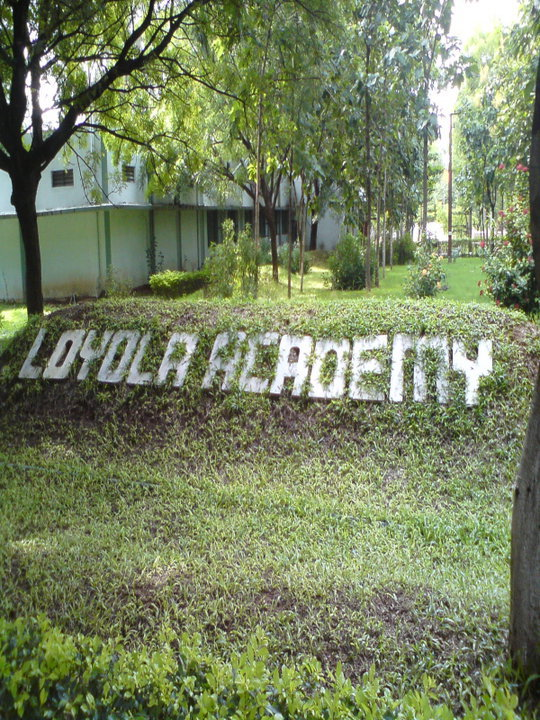
Loyola Academy

Loyola Academy Degree and PG College is a private Catholic minority higher education institution run by the Jesuit priests of the order of the Society of Jesus situated in Old Alwal (Telangana), India. It was established by Rev Fr Baliah SJ in 1976 The college is affiliated with the Osmania University and was granted the status of autonomy in 1992 by the University Grants Commission (UGC).

== History ==
The academy started with an intermediate course in 1976, followed by a three-year course called associate degree of Chemical Technology (ADCT) in 1977.

Loyola Academy is managed and administered by the Jesuits of Andhra Jesuit Province of the Society of Jesus, an international Catholic religious order. Loyola Academy, Degree and Post Graduate College as well as Loyola Academy Junior College were founded by Fr. T. Balaiah, SJ in 1976 at Old Alwal, Secunderabad, Andhra Pradesh, India.

Loyola Academy has a campus of 138 acres, with playfields and farm. The University Grants Commission (UGC) awarded the rare status of "College with Potential for Excellence" to the college and also extended CPE phase II projects. The National Accreditation Council awarded Grade ‘A’ to the institution in recognition of its contribution to the cause of higher education in 2005. The college is NAAC reaccreditated with ‘A’ grade in the 3rd Cycle (2019) NIRF 2021: College (Rank-band: 151–200)

‘India Today’ rated the college for the third consecutive year by giving First Rank among the city colleges of Hyderabad and Secunderabad, for Commerce, Science and Arts. The college is under autonomous status from 2010 on.

== Courses ==
Courses and year of commencement

Undergraduate courses:

1 1978 B.Sc. Chemical Technology

2 1983 B.Sc. (Hons) Agricultural Science & Rural Development

3 1988 B.Sc. Computer Science & Engineering

4 1991 B.Com. Honours

5 1991 B.Sc. Electronics & Communication Technology

6 1994 B.Sc. Computer Systems & Engineering / Computer Science & Information Technology

7 1994 B.Com. Marketing

8 2001 B.Sc. Biotechnology, Genetics & Chemistry

9 2004 B.A. Mass Communication

10 2004 B.Sc. Food Technology & Management

11 2006 B.A. Psychology, English & Journalism

12 2007 B.Sc. Maths, Statistics & Computer Science

13 2008 B.Sc. Multimedia & Animation

14 2010 B.Com. Computers / Computer Applications

15 2011 B.B.A. Bachelor of Business Administration

16 2016 B.Com. International Accounting & Finance

17 2016 B.Sc. Computer Data Science & Data Analytics Engg.

18 2016 B.Com.(Hons) Strategic Finance

19 2018 B.Com. Business Process Management

20 2018 B.Sc. Food Science, Nutrition & Dietetics

21 2018 B.Com. Business Studies

22 2020 B.Sc. Computer Science & Cognitive Systems

23 2020 B.Com. Business Analytics

24 2021 B.A. Economics, Public Admn. & Computer Applications

25 2021 B.Sc. Computer Science & Cyber Security

26 2021 B.Sc. Computer Science & Artificial Intelligence

27 2022 B.Com. Information Systems

28 2022 B.B.A. Entrepreneurship Development

29 2022 B.Sc. Computer Science & Cloud Computing

30 2022 B.Sc. Computer Science & Internet of Things

31 2022 B.B.A. Retail Operations Management

32 2022 B.P.C Biology, Physics and Chemistary

33 2022 M.P.C Maths, Physics and Chemistary

34 2022 C.E.C Civics, Economics and Commerce

Postgraduate courses

1 1993 M.C.A. Master of Computer Applications

2 2001 M.B.A. Master of Business Administration

3 2003 M.Sc. Organic Chemistry

4 2006 M.Sc. Biotechnology

5 2013 M.Sc. Food Technology & Management

6 2020 M.Sc. Data Science

7 2020 M.Sc. Food Science & Nutrition

8 2022 M.Sc. Big Data Analytics

Ph.D. Programmes:

1 2022 School of Life Sciences

2 2022 School of Management

Career Advancement courses:

1 Skill Oriented Courses - 40

2 NPTEL / SWAYAM Courses

3 Competitive Courses like Civils, IELTS, GRE CAT etc.

4 CRT & Soft Skill Training

5 Innovation & Entrepreneurship Enhancing Programmes

6 Active MOUs - 40 & Networking with cluster colleges

7 MBA Twinning Program with Pondicherry Central University

8 PLANET (Loyola Academy Extension Programme)

9 Clubs & Culturals

== Campus ==
The campus is spread over 133 acres (0.54 km^{2}).

== Accreditation ==
Affiliated to Osmania University, Established in 1978 Autonomous College (1992 UG & 2010 PG) College with Potential for Excellence (2006) NAAC Accredited with ‘A’ grade in the 3rd Cycle (2019) NIRF 2021: College (Rank-band: 151–200)

== See also ==
- List of Jesuit sites
