= Pratap (2026 film) =

- Theatrical release poster
- Directed by: Sachin Saraf
- Written by: Sachin Saraf
- Produced by: Pradeep Rangwani
- Starring: Amit Sadh; Esha Deol; Seema Biswas; Tigmanshu Dhulia; Milind Gunaji; Dushyant Wagh
- Cinematography: Anil B. Akki
- Edited by: Sandeep Sethy
- Music by: Rohan Rohan; Afzal Ali Khan
- Production company: UV Films
- Release date: 20 November 2026
- Country: India
- Language: Hindi

Pratap is an upcoming Indian Hindi-language action drama film written and directed by Sachin Saraf. The film stars Amit Sadh in the titular role, alongside Esha Deol, Seema Biswas, Tigmanshu Dhulia and Milind Gunaji. It is produced by Pradeep Rangwani under the banner of UV Films. The film is scheduled for theatrical release on 20 November 2026.

== Plot ==
Pratap follows a decorated police encounter specialist whose life takes an unexpected turn when he finds himself imprisoned. The film explores his struggle as he faces the circumstances surrounding his imprisonment.

== Cast ==
- Amit Sadh as Pratap
- Esha Deol
- Seema Biswas
- Tigmanshu Dhulia
- Milind Gunaji
- Dushyant Wagh

== Production ==
The film is written and directed by Sachin Saraf and produced by Pradeep Rangwani under the banner of UV Films. The film's first-look poster was unveiled in September 2026.

== Release ==
The film's official trailer was released on 26 October 2026. The film was released theatrically in India on 20 November 2026.

== Reception ==
=== Critical response ===
Ronak Kotecha of The Times of India gave the film 3 out of 5 stars and wrote, "Although the story of 'Pratap' bears some resemblance to 'The Shawshank Redemption'—particularly in its depiction of prison life and the struggle for freedom—'Pratap' presents its own distinct narrative." Priyanka Gupta of Zee News stated, "Amit Sadh delivers a powerful performance in this emotional tale of an encounter specialist." Pratik Shekhar of News 18 Hindi wrote, " 'Pratap' is more than just an encounter drama; it is a battle involving the system and one's self-respect."
