= Alokananda Dasgupta =

Indian playback singer

- Born: Kolkata
- Occupation: Music composer
- Father: Buddhadeb Dasgupta

Alokananda Dasgupta is a contemporary music composer known for her work in Indian film and web series. She debuted as a music composer with the Marathi drama film Shala (2011). She has composed music and background scores for Netflix’s Sacred Games (2018), Amazon Prime’s Jubilee (2023), Breathe, Fandry (2013), and Trapped (2017), to name a few.

== Early life and career ==
Alokananda is the daughter of poet-filmmaker Buddhadeb Dasgupta. She is also a classically trained pianist and piano teacher. She studied Film Studies for two years at St. Xavier's College, Kolkata and then went to the York University, Toronto where she completed her bachelor's degree in Music Performance and Music Composition. After her course, Alokananda became the music assistant of Amit Trivedi for films like Udaan (2010), Aisha (2010), No One Killed Jessica (2011) and Chillar Party (2011).

She made her debut as a film composer with the Marathi film Shala (2011), which was followed by Fandry (2013), Anwar Ka Ajab Kissa (2013), Asha Jaoar Majhe (2014), and Trapped (2017). She gained wider recognition with composing the title track, soundtrack and background score for Netflix’s Sacred Games, for which she won the Filmfare OTT Award for Best Background Score (Series) in 2020. She also composed original score for Amazon Prime’s Breathe, Leila on Netflix, and The Rapist (2021), directed by Aparna Sen. In 2023, she scored the background music for the acclaimed period drama Jubilee (Amazon Prime Video), which earned her a second Filmfare OTT Award for Best Background Score (Series) in 2024. The same year, she also composed for The Jengaburu Curse. Her latest work includes Khauf (2025) on Amazon Prime Video and Akka, an upcoming YRF production for Netflix.

== Discography ==
Title	Year	Notes
Shala	2011	Marathi Film
B.A. Pass	2013	
Fandry	2013	Marathi Film
Anwar Ka Ajab Kissa	2013	
Asha Jaoar Majhe	2014	Bengali Film
Geelee	2015	Short film
Amdavad Ma Famous	2015	Documentary
Trapped	2016	
The Affair	2017	Short film
Juice	2017	Short film
Half Widow	2017	
Breathe	2018	TV series
Sacred Games	2018	TV series
Leila	2019	TV series
Roam Rome Mein	2019	
Bebaak	2019	Short film
The Booth	2019	Short film
Breathe: Into the Shadows	2020	TV series
AK vs AK	2020	
Ajeeb Daastaans	2021	
2024	2021	
Shiv Shashtri Balboa	2022	
Kicking Balls	2022	Short Film
Jubilee	2023	
The Jengaburu Curse	2023	
Three Of Us	2023	
Spying Stars	2025	
