= Rugby Football Excursion =

Poem by Louis MacNeice

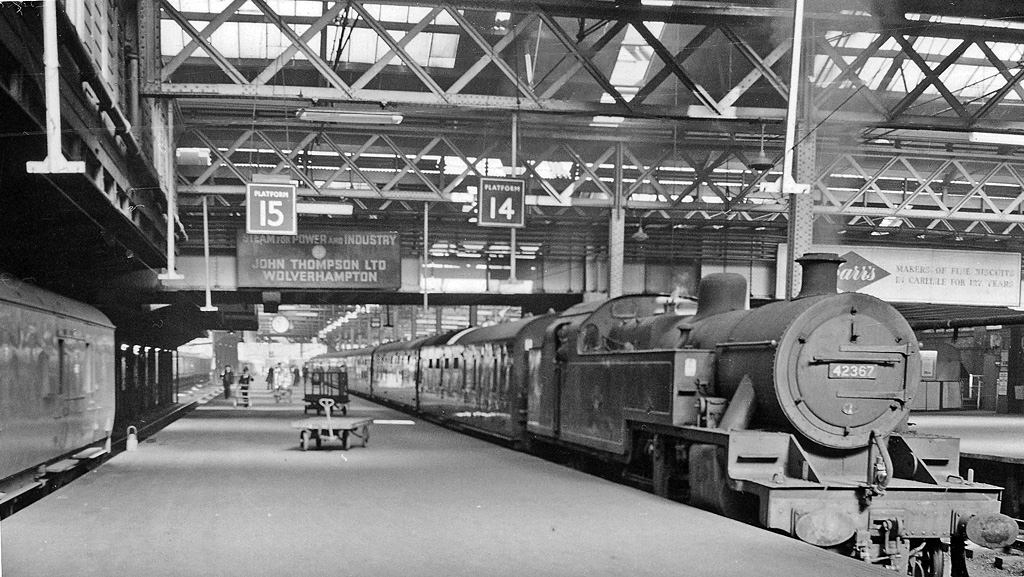
Departure platforms at Euston railway station, 1962

Rugby Football Excursion is a 44-line poem by Louis MacNeice. It was written in 1938 and first published in book form in MacNeice's poetry collection The Earth Compels (1938). The poem recounts an excursion taken by MacNeice from London to Dublin, in order to watch a rugby football match at Lansdowne Road stadium. MacNeice does not specify the occasion, but internal evidence from the poem establishes the match as a rugby football international when England defeated Ireland on 12 February 1938, 36 - 14.

== Background ==
Eccentric scoring—Nicholson, Marshall and Unwin,
Replies by Bailey and Daly;
Rugs around our shins, the effortless place-kick
Gaily carving the goalposts.

— "Rugby Football Excursion", lines 21-24

Louis MacNeice, like his fellow Irish writer Samuel Beckett, took a keen interest in rugby football. MacNeice played rugby while a pupil at Sherborne Preparatory School and Marlborough College, and later enjoyed watching matches involving Ireland. The Irish poet Conor O'Callaghan, reviewing the Collected Poems of Louis MacNeice in Poetry magazine, notes that MacNeice left Ireland for boarding school in England at the age of ten and never lived in Ireland again. "However, he always supported Ireland in international rugby matches with England".

Rugby Football Excursion recounts an excursion taken by MacNeice from London to Dublin, in order to watch a rugby football match at Lansdowne Road stadium. The journey begins by train from Euston railway station:

Euston—the smell of soot and fish and petrol;
Then in the train jogging and jogging,

— lines 1-2

The journey then continues by boat across the Irish Sea on the passenger vessel Hibernia, before arriving in Dublin:

Horse-cabs and outside cars—the ballyhoo for trippers—
And College Park reposeful behind the railings;

— lines 13-14

(College Park is a cricket ground in the grounds of Trinity College, Dublin.)

MacNeice then evokes the atmosphere at Lansdowne Road, where is to be played the rugby football match. MacNeice does not specify the actual occasion, but the details provided in the sixth stanza - "Eccentric scoring - Nicholson, Marshall and Unwin, / Replies by Bailey and Daly" - establish the match as a rugby football international between Ireland and England in the 1938 Home Nations Championship, played on 12 February 1938. England led 23-0 at half-time but Ireland improved during the second half, managing to score four tries (the last of which was scored by Maurice Daly, making his first and only appearance for Ireland). England won the match by 36 points to 14, with tries by (among others) Basil Nicholson, Mike Marshall and Jimmy Unwin. Pathé News made a newsreel of this match. The newsreel shows the English and Irish teams running onto the pitch, watched by a huge crowd, followed by various shots of the match in progress.

After the match, as MacNeice recounts, he had "tea and toast with Fellows and Bishops" in a Regency room overlooking St Stephen's Green, before taking "a walk through Dublin down the great / Grey streets broad and straight and drowned in twilight". The poem ends with MacNeice leaving Dublin, taking the boat from Dún Laoghaire back across the Irish Sea to England.

== Structure ==
Rugby Football Excursion is a poem of eleven stanzas, each of four lines. The poem does not make use of end rhyme. MacNeice does however make formal use of internal rhyme, rhyming the end of the second line in each stanza with the beginning of the fourth line ("Daly/Gaily", "twilight/High lights"). An additional internal rhyme comes in the last stanza, where "beery" rhymes with Dún Laoghaire (pronounced Dunleary).

The poem is autobiographical, and is narrated in the first person by Louis MacNeice.

== Themes ==
And then a walk through Dublin down the great
Grey streets broad and straight and drowned in twilight,
Statues of poets and Anglo-Irish patriots—
High lights of merged traditions.

— "Rugby Football Excursion", lines 29-32

The literary critic Samuel Hynes notes how Louis MacNeice "commonly presented himself... as a lover of ordinary pleasures". Hynes quotes a passage from Zoo (1938), written the same year as Rugby Football Excursion, in which MacNeice describes reacting with delight to (among other things) "Moran’s two classic tries at Twickenham in 1937". Rugby Football Excursion is on one level a poem about the pleasure and excitement of watching a rugby football match: "Lansdowne Road - the swirl of faces, flags, / Gilbert and Sullivan music, emerald jerseys..." However, the poem also explores MacNeice's ambivalent feelings about Ireland and his Irish heritage, a theme which is present in other poems by MacNeice from this period such as Carrickfergus and Autumn Journal. His walk through Dublin after the match takes him past "Statues of poets and Anglo-Irish patriots" but also takes in "Junkshops, the smell of poverty" and "street on street of broken / Fanlights over the doors of tenement houses".
