= Epilogue for W. H. Auden =

1936 poem by Louis MacNeice

"Epilogue for W. H. Auden" is a 76-line poem by Louis MacNeice. It was written in late 1936 and was first published in book form in Letters from Iceland, a travel book in prose and verse by W. H. Auden and Louis MacNeice (1937). MacNeice subsequently included it as the last poem in his poetry collection The Earth Compels (1938). "Epilogue for W. H. Auden" reviews the Iceland trip MacNeice and Auden had taken together in the summer of 1936; the poem mentions events that had occurred while MacNeice and Auden were in Iceland, such as the fall of Seville (marking the start of the Spanish Civil War) and the Olympic Games in Berlin.

== Biographical background ==
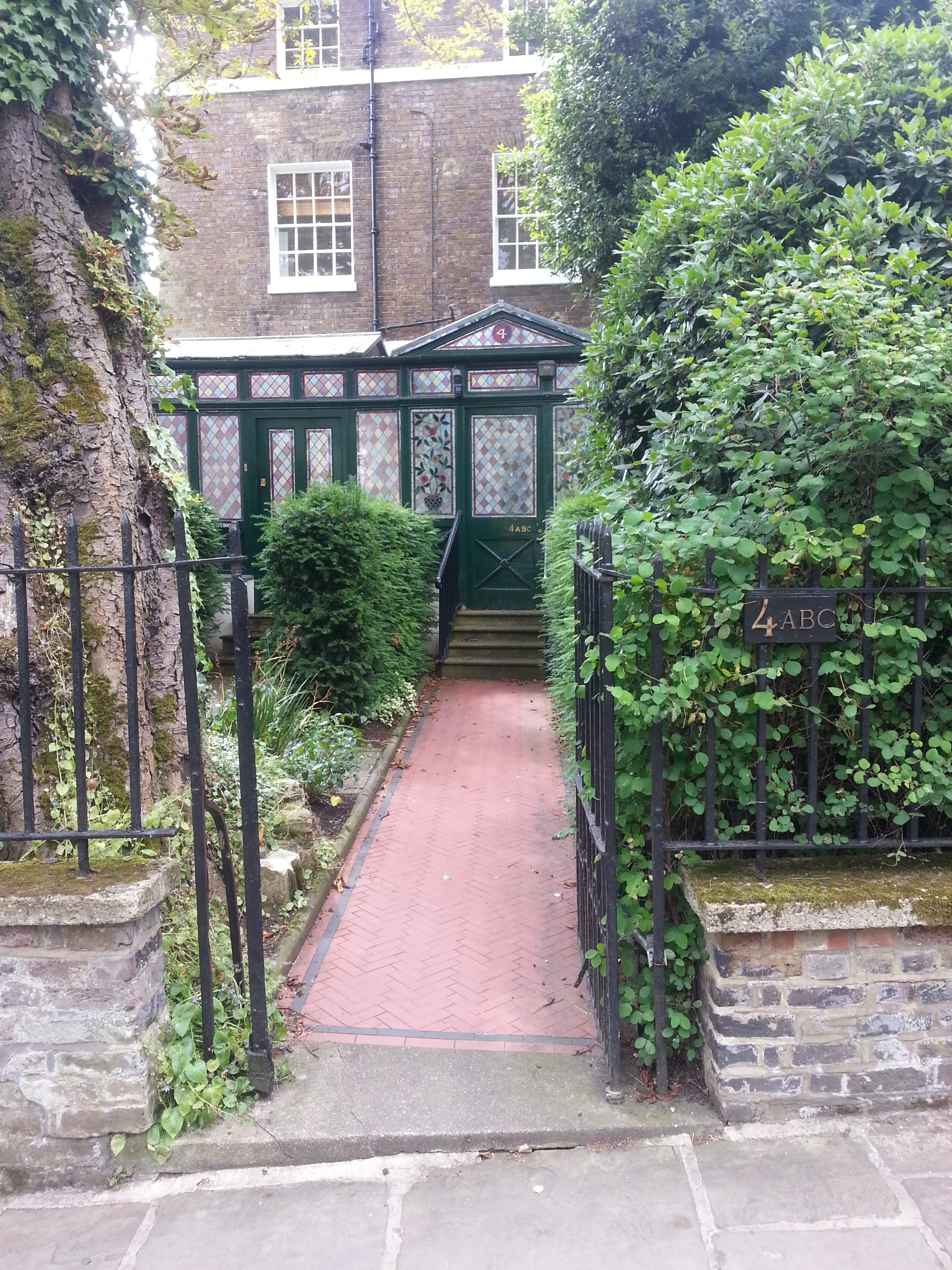
Entrance to 4 Keats Grove, Hampstead, London. It was while living here that Louis MacNeice wrote "Epilogue for W. H. Auden". ("Here in Hampstead I sit late...")

Now the winter nights begin
Lonely comfort walls me in;
So before the memory slip
I review our Iceland trip—

— "Epilogue for W. H. Auden", Stanza 1
Letters from Iceland

W. H. Auden and Louis MacNeice made a trip to Iceland in the summer of 1936. Auden travelled first, in early June; MacNeice followed in early August, arriving in Reykjavík on 9 August. MacNeice spent his first week in Reykjavik, after which the two poets took part in an expedition to circumnavigate the Langjökull (or Long Glacier) on horseback. Auden found MacNeice 'the ideal travelling companion, funny, observant, tolerant and good-tempered', and many years later would say: 'I have very rarely in my life enjoyed myself so much as I did during those weeks when we were constantly together.' Jon Stallworthy comments that something of the flavour of the conversations between Auden and MacNeice on the Iceland trip ("And the don in me set forth... And the don in you replied...") is captured in Epilogue for W. H. Auden.

The result of the Iceland trip was Letters from Iceland, a travel book in prose and verse. Auden and MacNeice spent much of November and December 1936 together working on the book, and it was in this period that MacNeice wrote Epilogue for W. H. Auden. ("Now the winter nights begin / Lonely comfort walls me in...".) At this time both Auden and MacNeice were living in London; MacNeice had moved into a flat in Keats Grove, Hampstead on 6 November ("Here in Hampstead I sit late..."), while Auden was living nearby with the painters Nancy and William Coldstream. The picture MacNeice gives in "Epilogue for W. H. Auden" of "loneliness / And uncommunicableness" (stanza 17) is somewhat contradicted by letters written at the same time describing his new life in Hampstead: "Wystan is very nice indeed & we had a marvellous time in Iceland... I enjoyed Spain too, & now London. Hampstead is the best part to live, I think. Stephen Spender is back in London & I am going to a party he is having this Thursday... Not that I'm really lonely because I'm so busy – or else so idle in that I waste a lot of time seeing people & talking." (10 November 1936).

== Form ==
"Epilogue for W. H. Auden" is a poem of 19 stanzas, each of four lines. The rhyme scheme is AABB. The poem is written in tetrameters (lines of four metrical feet). Auden would later use the same rhyme scheme and metre (tetrameter couplets) in the last section of In Memory of W. B. Yeats (1939).

== Themes ==
Down in Europe Seville fell,
Nations germinating hell,
The Olympic games were run—
Spots upon the Aryan sun.

— "Epilogue for W. H. Auden", Stanza 3

In "Epilogue for W. H. Auden", MacNeice reviews the Iceland trip he and Auden had taken together in the summer of 1936, contrasting the 'lonely comfort' of his flat in Hampstead with the companionable discomfort of their weeks in Iceland. The poem mentions events that had occurred "down in Europe" while MacNeice and Auden were in Iceland, such as the fall of Seville (marking the start of the Spanish Civil War) and the Olympic Games in Berlin (which Adolf Hitler designed as a demonstration of the supremacy of 'Aryan' races). The outbreak of the Spanish Civil War left MacNeice convinced both that a wider European war was inevitable, and that individual freedom would increasingly be threatened. This conviction is expressed both in the final stanza of Epilogue for W. H. Auden ("Our prerogatives as men / Will be cancelled who knows when"), and in another poem MacNeice wrote in late 1936, The Sunlight on the Garden.

Auden wrote in a similar way in his foreword to a new edition of Letters from Iceland, published in 1967: "Though writing in a 'holiday' spirit, its authors were all the time conscious of a threatening horizon to their picnic - world-wide unemployment, Hitler growing every day more powerful and a world-war more inevitable. Indeed, the prologue to that war, the Spanish Civil War, broke out while we were there."

== Critical commentary ==
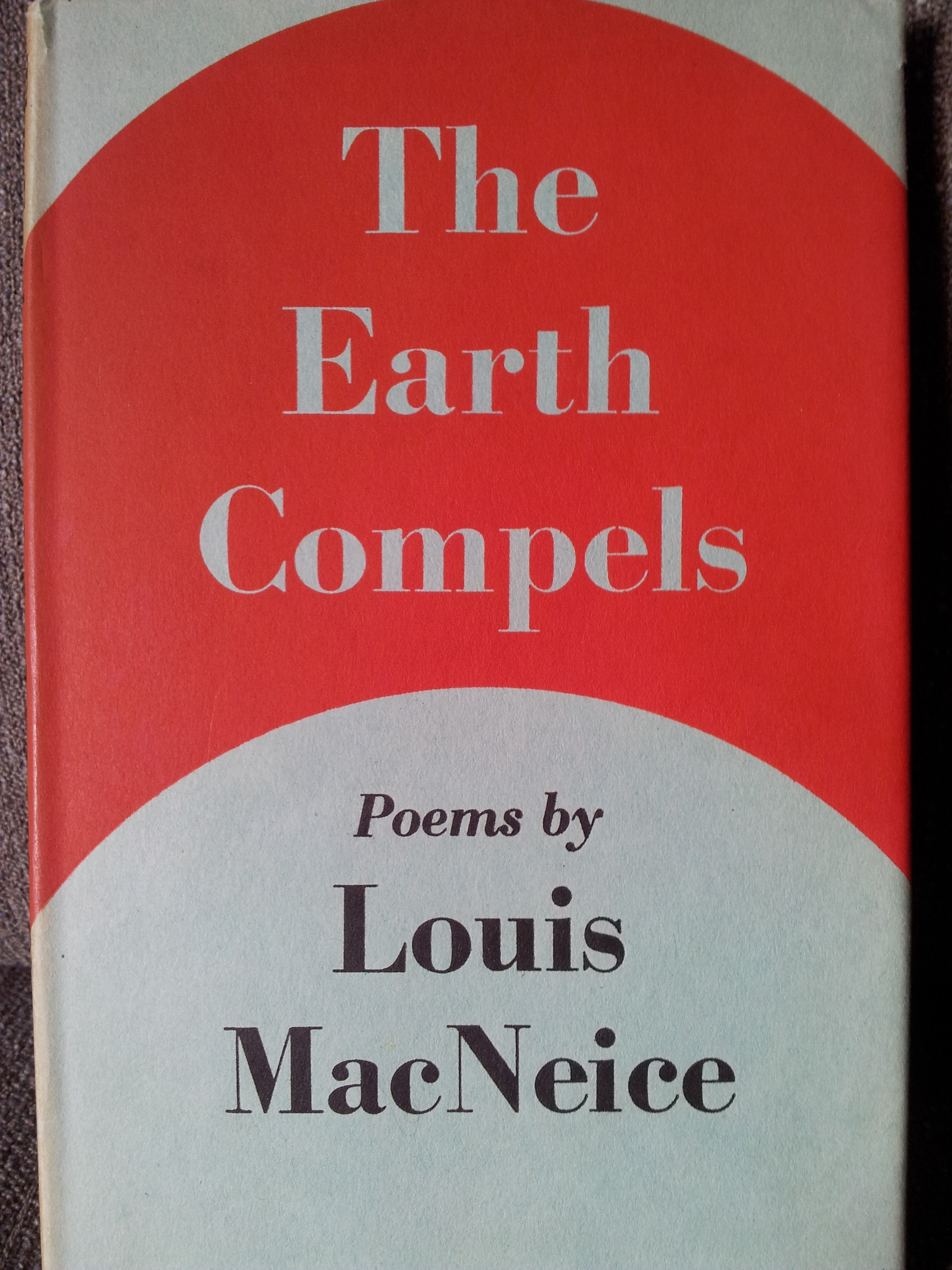
The Earth Compels. 1st edition, 1938. MacNeice included "Epilogue for W. H. Auden" as the last poem in this poetry collection.

Edna Longley, in her study of Louis MacNeice, comments that "Epilogue for W. H. Auden" is "MacNeice's most integrated use of Iceland as an imaginative focus, perhaps because retrospect has clarified the tension defined in 'a fancy turn, you know / Sandwiched in a graver show'."

Michael O'Neill and Gareth Reeves devote five pages of their book Auden, MacNeice, Spender: The Thirties Poetry (1992) to a discussion of "Epilogue: For W. H. Auden". O'Neill and Reeves write that this poem "does all the things expected of a thirties poem so comprehensively as to teeter on the verge of self-caricature - which is itself characteristic of the poetry of the period. But by the end it has transcended itself with great authority. At its core is private suffering, buried and yet painfully exposed. It uses all the tonal stops and tricks of diction at MacNeice's command." O'Neill and Reeves conclude that this poem "addresses an issue of paramount importance to MacNeice and his contemporaries: how to write poetry in an age that demands so much, while remaining true to the self and to poetry, to the poetic self."

Richard Danson Brown also includes a discussion of this poem in his book Louis MacNeice and the Poetry of the 1930s (2009). Richard Danson Brown writes that in this poem "MacNeice rehearses the tension between escapism and political reality as he reviews 'our Iceland trip' from his Hampstead home. The poem oscillates between celebration of the trip as a holiday from responsibility and the insistent sense of calamity, sometimes in the space of the same couplet: 'Time for the soul to stretch and spit / Before the world comes back on it'."
