= June Thunder =

June Thunder is a 28-line poem by Louis MacNeice. It was first published in book form in MacNeice's poetry collection The Earth Compels (1938). The poem begins with memories of idyllic summer days in the countryside - "the unenduring / Joys of a season" - before returning to the present and "impending thunder". June Thunder is written in a loose form of the sapphic stanza, with three lines set in falling rhythm followed by a shorter fourth line. The poem was anthologised in A New Anthology of Modern Verse 1920-1940 (1941), edited by Cecil Day-Lewis and L.A.G. Strong, and Penguin New Writing No. 2 (January 1941).

== Themes ==
Blackness at half-past eight, the night's precursor,
Clouds like falling masonry and lightning's lavish
Annunciation, the sword of the mad archangel
Flashed from the scabbard.

— "June Thunder", Stanza 6

Jon Stallworthy, in his biography of Louis MacNeice, links June Thunder to The Sunlight on the Garden, the poem that immediately follows June Thunder in MacNeice's 1938 poetry collection The Earth Compels. The two poems show MacNeice thinking along much the same lines and using the same imagery, with "birds", "sky", "garden", "thunder" and "rain" as shared words.

June Thunder begins with memories of earlier, idyllic summer days. The opening stanza, which describes "driving through tiny / Roads, the mudguards brushing the cowparsley", is similar in tone to section viii of Autumn Journal (1939), in which MacNeice recalls how he "drove around Shropshire in a bijou car" together with his first wife Mary Ezra. The second stanza, describing chalkland in summer, with beech trees and gorse, suggests the countryside close to Marlborough College, where MacNeice was a pupil. (As a schoolboy, MacNeice had indulged in "long bicycle rides into the Wiltshire countryside" with his close friend Graham Shepard.) In the third stanza the tone changes as the poem returns to the present and "impending thunder". Rain "comes / Down like a dropscene", and is followed by thunder - "clouds like falling masonry" - and lightning. The final stanza sees the poet alone and yearning for his lover's presence: "If only you would come..."

== Structure ==
June Thunder is a poem of seven stanzas, each of four lines. The poem does not make use of a rhyme scheme. The poem is written in a loose form of the sapphic stanza, and is included by Grace Schulman in a list of English poems that are "sapphics-inspired". The short fourth line of each stanza is an Adonic, as in a sapphic stanza: "Joys of a season". However, the long lines vary from ten to fourteen syllables, and "make no pretence at exact adherence to the paradigm." According to Harvey Gross and Robert McDowell, "MacNeice infuses his sapphics with those qualities of yearning and wonder that characterize the great examples of the form."
