= The Earth Compels =

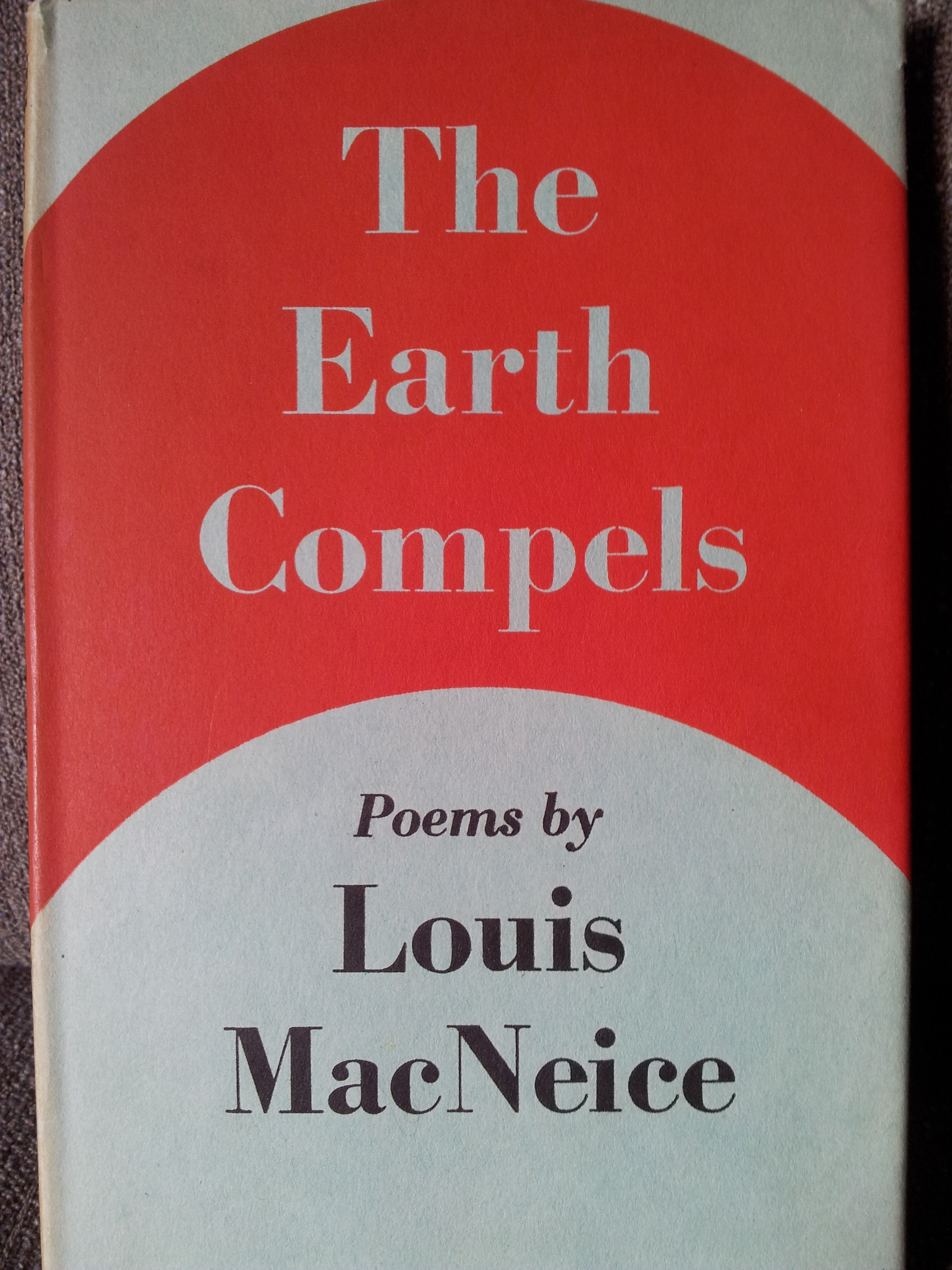
- Author: Louis MacNeice
- Language: English
- Genre: Poetry
- Publisher: Faber and Faber (London)
- Publication date: 1938
- Media type: Print
- Pages: 64

The Earth Compels was the second poetry collection by Louis MacNeice. It was published by Faber and Faber on 28 April 1938, and was one of four books by Louis MacNeice to appear in 1938, along with I Crossed the Minch, Modern Poetry: A Personal Essay and Zoo.

The first edition of The Earth Compels has the following blurb on the flap of the dust jacket: "Mr. MacNeice's position as a poet was incontestably established in 1935 by his first volume of Poems. He is one of the few poets to-day none of whose poems could have been written by anyone else. His second volume has been awaited for some time: now that it has arrived, it needs no advertisement."

The Earth Compels is dedicated "To NANCY" (Nancy Coldstream, later Nancy Spender, with whom Louis MacNeice had an affair during 1937–38), and has an epigraph from a Greek tragedy MacNeice was then translating, Euripides' Hippolytus. According to Jon Stallworthy, in his biography of Louis MacNeice, the epigraph may be roughly translated: 'We are manifestly all obsessively in love with this thing that glitters on the earth.'

Jon Stallworthy gives the following summary of The Earth Compels: "The book offers an impressionistic picture of a journey from brightness, 'The Sunlight on the Garden' (from which poem its title is taken), towards darkness; from Carrickfergus to Iceland and the Hebrides; from peace - by way of one World War - into the advancing shadows of another."

== Background ==
=== Publishing ===
The Earth Compels gathers together poems written by Louis MacNeice between 1935 and 1937. The manuscript was sent to the publishers Faber and Faber in late 1937. T. S. Eliot, who was an editor at Fabers and had previously given encouragement and support to MacNeice, wrote back on 6 January 1938: 'I have read THE EARTH COMPELS last night, and am very much pleased with it.' He had a couple of minor editorial queries, but as soon as these were settled, he said, 'the poems can go straight to the printer'. The collection was published in book form on 28 April 1938.

=== Title ===
The phrase "The earth compels" appears twice in the poem "The Sunlight on the Garden."

=== Attitude and background ===
Another book by Louis MacNeice also published in 1938, Modern Poetry: A Personal Essay, begins with the declaration: 'This book is a plea for impure poetry, that is, the poetry conditioned by the poet's life and the world around him.' This attitude provides the context for the poems in The Earth Compels. The poems were written during a turbulent period in MacNeice's life - he described 1937 as his 'year of wild sensations'. On a more public level, events in Germany and Spain had persuaded MacNeice that another European war was approaching.

=== Poems and autobiographical background ===
The first poem in the collection, 'Carrickfergus', is autobiographical, and describes MacNeice's childhood in Carrickfergus, Northern Ireland. Other poems reflect MacNeice's life in the years 1935 to 1937. In November 1935 MacNeice's first marriage had collapsed when his wife Mary left him for Charles Katzman; after their divorce had been finalised in 1936, MacNeice wrote The Sunlight on the Garden for Mary. In early 1937 MacNeice began an affair with Nancy Coldstream (later Nancy Spender), and Nancy provided the inspiration for 'Leaving Barra' (as well as for two sections of MacNeice's next volume of poetry, Autumn Journal). The poem 'Iceland' reflects the journey MacNeice took with W. H. Auden in the summer of 1936, while 'Bagpipe Music' was inspired by a journey to the Hebrides in 1937 and was later described by MacNeice as 'a satirical elegy for the Gaelic districts of Scotland and indeed for all traditional culture'. Rugby Football Excursion describes a journey from London - leaving from Euston railway station - to Dublin, in order to watch a rugby game at Lansdowne Road. The final poem in the collection, Epilogue, is subtitled 'For W. H. Auden', and reviews the Iceland trip MacNeice and Auden had taken together; the poem mentions events that had occurred while MacNeice and Auden were in Iceland, such as the fall of Seville (marking the start of the Spanish Civil War) and the Olympic Games in Berlin.

== Contents ==
The Earth Compels contains the following poems:

1. Carrickfergus
2. June Thunder
3. The Sunlight on the Garden
4. Chess
5. The Heated Minutes
6. Iceland
7. Solvitur Acris Hiems
8. Passage Steamer
9. Circus
10. Homage to Clichés
11. On those Islands
12. Eclogue from Iceland
13. Eclogue Between the Motherless
14. Leaving Barra
15. Hidden Ice
16. Taken for Granted
17. Thank You
18. Books, Do not Look at Me
19. Only let it Form
20. Now that the Shapes of Mist
21. Christmas Shopping
22. Bagpipe Music
23. Rugby Football Excursion
24. Epilogue

== Reception ==
The Earth Compels was generally favourably received by contemporary reviewers. Several reviewers commented on a greater engagement with 'the world' than the earlier Poems (1935) had displayed. Geoffrey Grigson, reviewing The Earth Compels in New Verse, commented that 'the elegance in MacNeice's poetry is more one of sensuality now and less one of ingenuity, and the poems he is writing are the experiences of a lonely contemplative person, occupied with himself and with the world we share'. Grigson went on to claim: 'there is no other poet now in England who's such a good writer (W. H. Auden may be on a bigger scale altogether, but at present he does very often make a mannerism of hs own inventions).'

On the other hand, the Scrutiny reviewer (Geoffrey Walton) dismissed The Earth Compels along with other recent books by MacNeice, and regretted 'there are not many poets writing at the moment whom one wants to read'.
