= Zoo (MacNeice book) =

1938 book

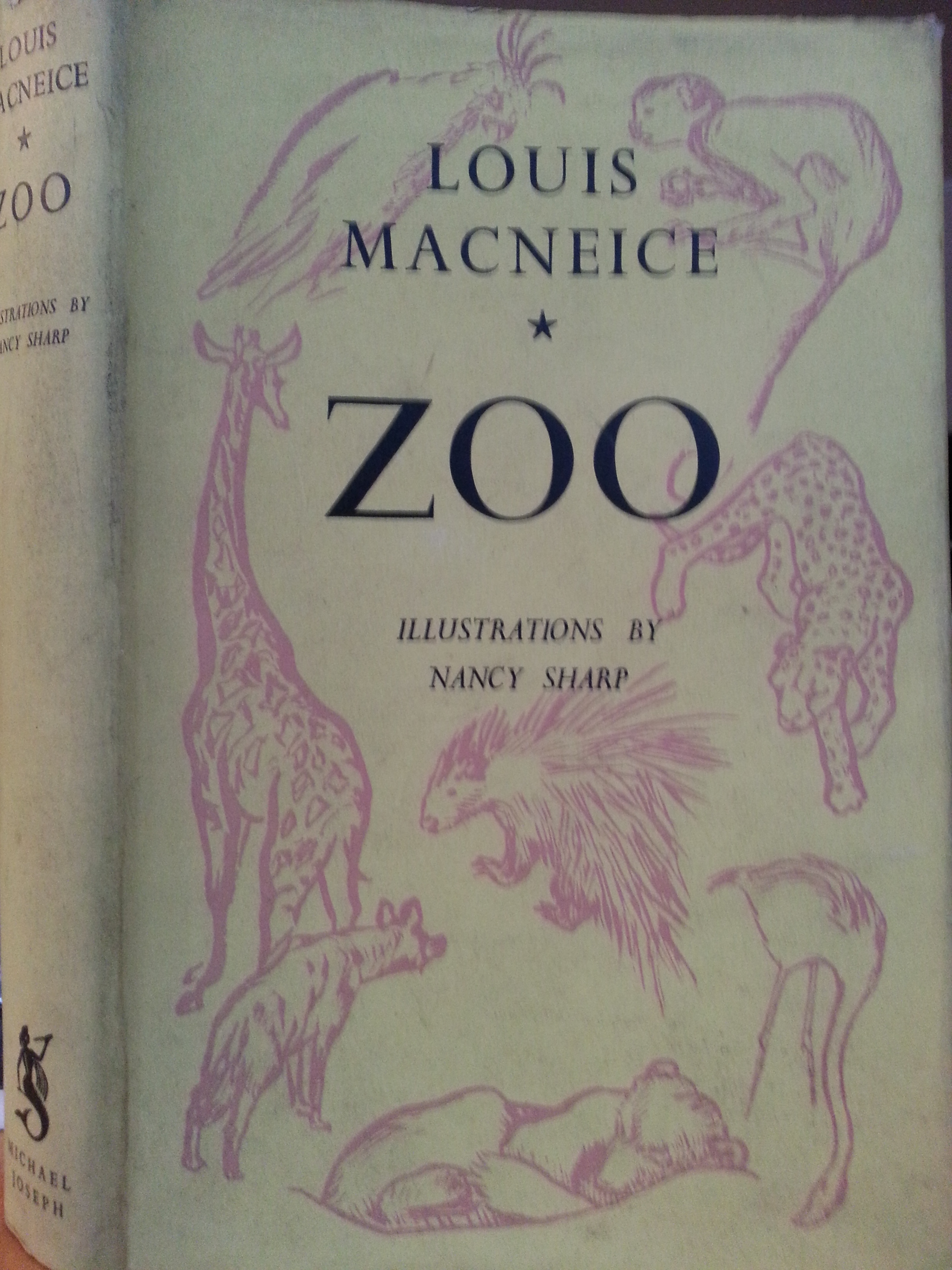
- First edition dust jacket of Zoo, a book by Louis MacNeice (1938)
- Author: Louis MacNeice
- Language: English
- Genre: Belles Lettres
- Publisher: Michael Joseph (London)
- Publication date: 1938
- Media type: Print
- Pages: 255

Zoo is a book by Louis MacNeice. It was published by Michael Joseph in November 1938, and according to the publisher's list belongs in the category of belles lettres. It was one of four books by Louis MacNeice to appear in 1938, along with The Earth Compels, I Crossed the Minch and Modern Poetry: A Personal Essay.

Zoo is primarily a book about London Zoo. During the writing of the book, from May to August 1938, Louis MacNeice was living in Primrose Hill Road, London, in a maisonette overlooking Primrose Hill and a short distance from London Zoo. (In the last chapter of the book, MacNeice notes that: "As I write this on Primrose Hill I can hear the lions roaring in the Zoo.") According to the blurb on the flap of the dust jacket, Zoo "contains impressions of the Zoo from a layman's point of view, and impressions of the visitors; information about the keepers and feeding of the animals (and visitors); discussion of the Zoo's architecture and general organisation; and special studies of animals."

The book also contains descriptions of Whipsnade Zoo, Bristol Zoo and the new Paris Zoo in the Bois de Vincennes, together with a number of "digressions" - short descriptions of the lawn tennis championships at Wimbledon, cricket matches at Lord's, and a week-end visit to Northern Ireland.

Zoo is illustrated with drawings, mainly in carbon pencil, by the English artist Nancy Coldstream (later Nancy Spender), under her maiden name of Nancy Sharp. Nancy Coldstream had earlier provided illustrations for I Crossed the Minch, a book on the Hebrides by Louis MacNeice.

Zoo was a Book Society Recommendation and, as Jon Stallworthy notes in his biography of Louis MacNeice, it "sold well enough, though much less well than Modern Poetry."

== Background ==
Zoo began as a commission from the publisher Michael Joseph for a book on the subject of London Zoo. "Designed for the armchair reader, this was to be more impressionistic than Julian Huxley's Official Guide to the Zoo." In May 1938 MacNeice moved into 16a Primrose Hill Road, London, a short distance from London Zoo, and in the course of the next three months he made many visits to the Zoo. These visits are often recorded in the book in diary-style entries:

"On June 1st I visited Regent's Park, a cold morning, June avenging the inopportune warmth of March. But the silver foxes were boxing and the mongooses making love in their straw."

"June 7th, Whit Tuesday, was fine and sunny. The Daily Sketch had out a poster - "R.A.F. Boxers Missing in Country of Savage Apes" - and the Zoo in the morning was full of people on holiday... The animals were far outnumbered and their occasional croaks and whimperings drowned in a torrent of words."

"June 9th was a fresh morning, gay with farmyard cluckings and the crisp yelps of sea-lions. On the Mappin Terraces the bears were lively, stalking on their hind legs and looking for buns which were not, for people had gone back to work. On one of the top crags a goat sat motionless in profile like an acroterion on the ruin of a Greek temple."

MacNeice worked on Zoo, writing little else, through June, July and the first half of August 1938, taking the occasional break to watch tennis at Wimbledon or cricket at Lord's. These breaks are also described in the book. On June 22 MacNeice went to the lawn tennis championships at Wimbledon, where he watched the American tennis player Helen Wills Moody in a second-round game against Nell Hall Hopman. Helen Wills Moody went on to win the Women's Singles at the 1938 Wimbledon Championships, but MacNeice was "very disappointed" with her playing style: "She plays like any other woman in a tournament, cautiously retrieving and retrieving, never going up to the net." On July 27 "I did not go to the Zoo, but, as I was about to enter my house, I saw someone watching the door whom I did not want to meet, so I changed my course and went to Lord's. There my old school, Marlborough, were playing their annual match with Rugby, a match which I had never yet watched. The game was a dull game, but I met a number of old boys and we stood each other beer in glaring sun."

The final chapter of the book, 'Whipsnade and Last Words', describes a visit to Whipsnade Zoo on August 18, 1938, and a last visit to London Zoo on a wet Wednesday evening a few days before. After the manuscript was delivered to its publisher, MacNeice went on holiday to Hampshire, where he began his long poem Autumn Journal. Some phrases and images from Zoo reappear in Autumn Journal: "As I write this on Primrose Hill I can hear the lions roaring in the Zoo" (Zoo) becomes "When the lions roar beneath the hill" (Autumn Journal, ii).

The literary critic Samuel Hynes, writing in the London Review of Books, quotes the following passage from Zoo to illustrate how MacNeice commonly presented himself as a lover of ordinary pleasures:

"The pleasure of dappled things, the beauty of adaptation to purpose, the glory of extravagance, classic elegance or romantic nonsense and grotesquerie – all these we get from the Zoo. We react to these with the same delight as to new potatoes in April speckled with chopped parsley or to the lights at night on the Thames of Battersea Power House, or to cars sweeping their shadows from lamp-post to lamp-post down Haverstock Hill or to brewer’s drays or to lighthouses and searchlights or to a newly cut lawn or to a hot towel or a friction at the barber’s or to Moran’s two classic tries at Twickenham in 1937 or to the smell of dusting-powder in a warm bathroom or to the fun of shelling peas into a china bowl or of shuffling one’s feet through dead leaves when they are crisp or to the noise of rain or the crackling of a newly lit fire or the jokes of a street-hawker or the silence of snow in moonlight or the purring of a powerful car."

== Contents ==
Zoo contains the following chapters:

1. In Self-Defence
2. The Zoo and London
3. Layout
4. Wild and Domestic
5. A Personal Digression
6. Impressions: Early June
7. The Annual Report
8. Impressions: Middle June
9. Question and Answer
10. Impressions: Later June
11. The Aquarium
12. Impressions: July
13. More Impressions: July
14. Zoos in Paris
15. Whipsnade and Last Words

== Reception ==
Jon Stallworthy, in his biography of Louis MacNeice, comments on the book as follows: "Written to much the same recipe as Letters from Iceland and I Crossed the Minch, Zoo is less successful than its predecessors. An early chapter, 'The Zoo and London', shows MacNeice the philosopher-poet at his zestful best, but much of what follows is undistinguished journalism, and there are no poems."
