= Carrickfergus (poem) =

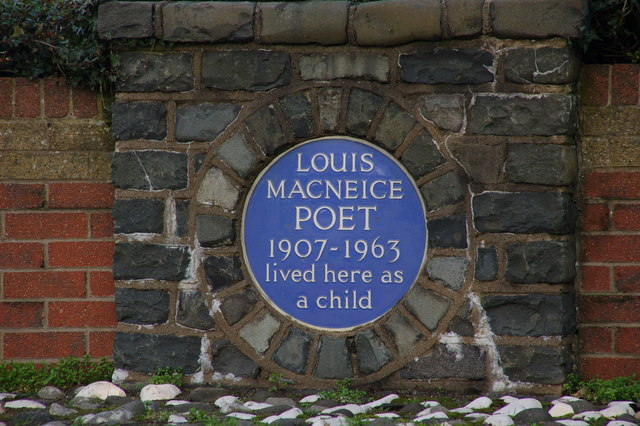
Plaque at Louis MacNeice's childhood home in Carrickfergus

"Carrickfergus" is a 44-line poem by Louis MacNeice. It was written in 1937 and first published in book form in MacNeice's poetry collection The Earth Compels (1938). The poem reflects on MacNeice's childhood in Carrickfergus, a large town in County Antrim, Northern Ireland. Although the title of the poem is "Carrickfergus", the text of the poem refers to "Carrick", as the town is known locally and colloquially.

== Background ==
Louis MacNeice was born in 1907 in Belfast, as he notes in the opening lines of "Carrickfergus":

I was born in Belfast between the mountain and the gantries
To the hooting of lost sirens and the clang of trams:'"`UNIQ--ref-00000002-QINU`"'

— lines 1-2

'Gantries' refers to the Harland and Wolff shipyard, and the Arrol Gantry which dominated the skyline. This was constructed just after MacNiece's birth but was well-known within a few years as the building place of RMS Titanic. The 'mountain' is the Black Mountain, which forms a backdrop to inland Belfast.

In November 1907 MacNeice's father, John MacNeice, was appointed Rector of St Nicholas' Church, Carrickfergus, and in January 1909 the family moved to Carrickfergus, a town ten miles from Belfast on the northern shore of Belfast Lough:

Thence to Smoky Carrick in County Antrim
Where the bottle-neck harbour collects the mud which jams

The little boats beneath the Norman castle,'"`UNIQ--ref-00000007-QINU`"'

— lines 3-5

The MacNeices lived first in a house at 5 Governor's Walk, facing the harbour. "Its front door opened on the street, the farther side of which was flanked by the harbour wall, so that in rough weather spray would lash the windows. The rector liked its closeness to the sea as well as to the historic castle (a stone's throw to the left) and to his church." In early 1911 the MacNeices moved into Carrickfergus Rectory, a large house with a garden, "far from the dirt and noise of the harbour, on the other side of town." Here Louis MacNeice spent his childhood until, at the age of ten, he began at Sherborne Preparatory School, Dorset:

I went to school in Dorset, the world of parents
Contracted into a puppet world of sons'"`UNIQ--ref-0000000B-QINU`"'

— lines 41-42

In "Carrickfergus", MacNeice reflects on his childhood growing up in Carrickfergus. One stanza describes his position as the son of John MacNeice – "I was the rector's son, born to the anglican order" – and mentions the Chichester Monument, an elaborate marble monument in St Nicholas' Church which made a deep impression on the young Louis MacNeice. He would later include a description of the Chichester Monument in his unfinished autobiography, The Strings are False: "a huge Elizabethan monument to the Chichester family who had then been the power in the land." "Carrickfergus" also describes a wartime childhood, with rationing and "maps above the fireplace", and a "huge camp of soldiers" in sight of Carrickfergus Rectory.

== Structure ==
"Carrickfergus" is a poem of eleven stanzas, each of four lines. The second and fourth lines of each stanza rhyme. (The sixth stanza has the same word, "long", at the end of the second and fourth line.) MacNeice makes use of poetic devices such as assonance – "the clang of trams" – and alliteration – "sweat and khaki in the Carlisle train". The poem is autobiographical, and is narrated in the first person by Louis MacNeice: "I was born in Belfast... I was the rector's son... I went to school in Dorset..."
