= Childe Roland to the Dark Tower Came =

Poem by Robert Browning

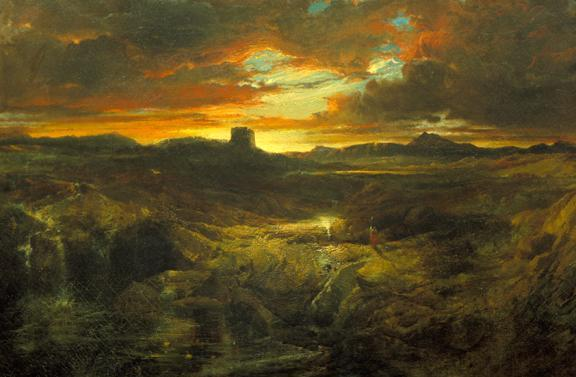
Childe Roland to the Dark Tower Came painted by Thomas Moran in 1859.

"Childe Roland to the Dark Tower Came" is a narrative poem by English author Robert Browning, written on 2 January 1852, and first published in 1855 in the collection titled Men and Women. The poem is often noted for its dark and atmospheric imagery, inversion of classical tropes, and use of unreliable narration. Childe Roland, the only speaker in the poem, describes his journey towards "the Dark Tower", and his horror at what he sees on his quest. The poem ends when Roland finally reaches the tower, leaving his ultimate fate ambiguous.

== Synopsis ==
The poem opens with Roland's suspicion about the truthfulness of a "hoary" crippled man with "malicious eye", whose advice he nevertheless follows by choosing to turn off the thoroughfare into an 'ominous tract' that leads to the Dark Tower. The gloomy, cynical Roland describes how he had been searching for the tower for so long that he could barely feel any joy at finally finding the pathway to it, just a grim hope "that some end might be". Roland describes himself as being like "a sick man very near to death" whose friends have all abandoned him, as Roland had always been dismissed as a member of "The Band"—a group of knights searching for the Dark Tower, all of whom had failed in their quest. Despite that, all Roland wants is to join The Band, whatever the cost.

As soon as he steps into the path towards the Dark Tower, the landscape around him shifts, and Roland finds himself completely alone in a featureless wasteland. Wandering onwards, he describes the desolate conditions with increasing despair, until he finds the emaciated body of a horse. Roland is disgusted by its appearance, saying "I never saw a brute I hated so; / He must be wicked to deserve such pain."

In an attempt to regain some semblance of strength after the trauma of his surroundings, Roland tries to remember happier times, and thinks back on his old friends. The memory of his friends and fellow knights Cuthbert and Giles brings him comfort, but he then remembers the downfall of each of them (Cuthbert by "one night's disgrace", and Giles by being hanged and declared a traitor by his friends), and his heart is shattered all over again.

Declaring "better this present than a past like that", Roland finds the energy to keep on moving. He reaches a river which he fords with trepidation, half-convinced that he is stepping on dead bodies floating under the water. Reaching the other bank, Roland is disturbed once more by the apocalyptic landscape, envisioning some dreadful battle that must have happened to create the scene of devastation he observes. Eventually the plain gives way to mountains, and Roland finds himself stuck, unable to find a clear path forward.

Suddenly, Roland realizes that the mountain he has been looking at is the very one that hides the Dark Tower.

The sunset sets the scene ablaze at that very moment, and a strange sound fills the air. "[I]n a sheet of flame" Roland sees the faces of his dead friends, and hears their names whispered in his ears. Remembering their lives, Roland finds himself surrounded by a "living frame" of old friends. Filled with inspiration, he pulls out his "slug-horn", and blows, shouting "Childe Roland to the dark tower came".

At this, the poem ends, leaving what lies inside of the Dark Tower a mystery.

== Inspiration ==
The title, "Childe Roland to the Dark Tower Came", which forms the last words of the poem, is a line from William Shakespeare's play King Lear (ca. 1607). In the play, Gloucester's son, Edgar, lends credence to his disguise as Tom o' Bedlam by talking nonsense, of which this is a part:

Childe Rowland to the dark tower came.
His word was still "Fie, foh, and fum,
I smell the blood of a British man."

— King Lear, act 3, scene 4, lines 195-197

A "Childe" in this context is the eldest son of a nobleman who has not yet attained knighthood, or who has not yet "won his spurs". It has been proposed that Browning also took inspiration from the 11th-century epic poem The Song of Roland, which features Roland, Charlemagne's loyal paladin, blowing his hunting horn (as Childe Roland also does at the end of the poem) to call for help before he dies.

Browning claimed that the poem came to him in a dream, saying "I was conscious of no allegorical intention of writing it ... Childe Roland came upon me as a kind of dream. I had to write it then and there, and I finished it the same day, I believe. I do not know what I meant beyond that, and I do not know now. But I am very fond of it."

== Structure ==
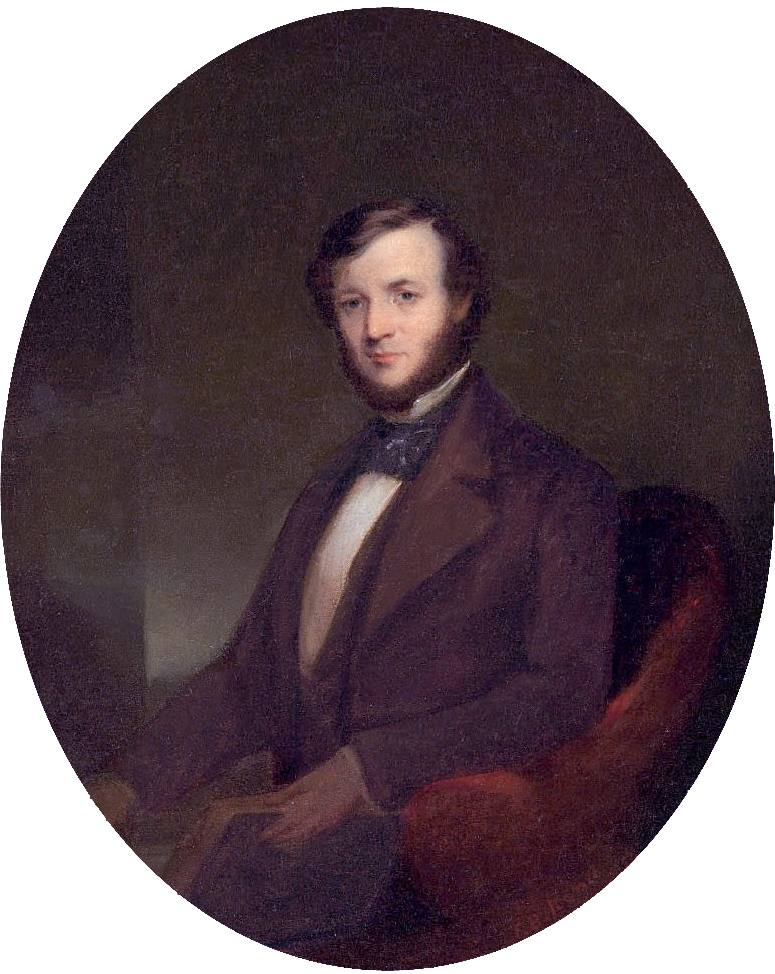
The poet, Robert Browning

Browning explores Roland's journey to the Dark Tower in 34 six-line stanzas with the rhyme scheme ABBAAB, using iambic pentameter throughout. It is filled with nightmarish images, but the setting is given unusual reality by much fuller descriptions of the landscape than was normal for Browning at any other time in his career. Many complex visual motifs are woven throughout the poem, including images of disease and deformity, as well as fire (connected with redness and death), eyes (both seeing and blinded), the idea of being suddenly trapped, and destroyed plant life.

Despite having a clear narrative structure, the precise point at which a given scene shifts to another is made unclear throughout much of the poem, creating a sense of "esthetic inevitability" in the reader.

== Setting ==
The setting of Childe Roland is nightmarish and hallucinatory in nature, and seems to act as a sort of mirror to Roland's psyche throughout the poem. Catherine Blass writes:

"Roland participates in a seemingly endless, futile quest deep into a landscape that he can never be certain exists outside of his own mind. He is unable to rely fully on his senses to determine his place or direction, which leaves him in mental and emotional agony. At times, he sees things that immediately after disappear, or that shift in front of his eyes; at other times, his senses abandon him completely ... The speaker appears to see these images with his eyes as he would something tangible; yet, his sight proves unreliable since these supposedly concrete, observable images ... move in and out of his consciousness. His 'seeing' of these figures occurs, in part, within his own mind, and is inseparable from his conscious thoughts about seeing each."

== Interpretation ==
William Lyon Phelps proposes three different interpretations of the poem: In the first two, the Tower is a symbol of a knightly quest. Success only comes through failure or the end is the realization of futility. In his third interpretation, the Tower is simply damnation.

For Margaret Atwood, Childe Roland is Browning himself, his quest is to write this poem, and the Dark Tower contains that which Roland/Browning fears most: Roland/Browning "in his poem-writing aspect".

Harold Bloom reads the poem as a "loving critique" of Shelley, and describes Roland as questing for his own failure.

A footnote in the Penguin Classics edition (Robert Browning Selected Poems) advises against allegorical interpretation, saying "readers who wish to try their hand should be warned that the enterprise strongly resembles carving a statue out of fog." This sentiment is echoed by many critics, who believe any quest for interpretation will ultimately fail, due to the dreamlike, illusionary nature of the poem.

== Influences on, and references in, other works ==
"Childe Roland" has served as inspiration to a number of popular works of fiction, including:

- The Dark Tower, a 1946 radio play by Louis MacNeice with incidental music by Benjamin Britten, was based on the poem. It follows the basic theme of the original with references to the quest, the dark tower, and the trumpet.
- American author Stephen King for his The Dark Tower series of stories and novels (1978–2012).
  - King also references the text, along with the origin text of King Lear, in his novel Fairy Tale, published in 2022.
- Bob Dylan's 1967 song All Along the Watchtower used Browning's symbolic imagery, creating a poetic 'sequel' to allegorize the artist's struggle with fame.
- American author Countee Cullen for "From the Dark Tower" poem (1927)
- American author Alexander Theroux based his story "Childe Roland" (in Three Wogs, 1972) on Browning's poem.
- Roland Childe, a prominent character in Welsh science fiction author Alastair Reynolds's novella Diamond Dogs (2001) takes his name from the poem. The novella also features a group of characters on a quest to a mysterious tower.
- Canadian science-fiction author Gordon R. Dickson for his Childe Cycle series of novels (1959–2001).
- American science-fiction author Andre Norton for the fourth novel in her "Witch World" series (1967).
- Elidor (1965) by English writer Alan Garner.
- Louise Berridge claims that Childe Roland was the inspiration behind the main character in her Chevalier series of novels.
- The Doctor Who Twentieth Anniversary special "The Five Doctors" takes much imagery and several key phrases from the poem which has been cited as a source by screenwriter Terrance Dicks.
- British novelist A. S. Byatt for the character Roland Michell (and perhaps his formidable love interest Maud Bailey, where "Bailey" is a synonym for "tower") in her novel Possession: A Romance (1990).
- Willa Cather's The Burglar's Christmas.
- In The Dark Tower (1977) by C. S. Lewis, a tower set in a dystopian future is named the "Dark Tower", after Browning's poem. This name also lends itself to the unfinished manuscript, and the book it was published in.
- In Anthony Powell's 12-part cycle A Dance to the Music of Time, the eighth novel, The Soldier's Art, takes its title from line 89 of Childe Roland ("Think first, fight afterwards—the soldier's art").
- John Connolly's novel The Book of Lost Things (2006).
- Roger Zelazny's novel Sign of the Unicorn (1975) refers to the song and the poem (part of The Chronicles of Amber series).
- Lawrence Ferlinghetti's poem "I Am Waiting" refers to Childe Rowland coming "to the final darkest tower".
- John Ashbery’s poem "The System" from his book Three Poems (1972) muses on Childe Roland's potential facial expressions, as well as the image of the knight's approaching The Dark Tower, to stand for a state of "expectancy" created before confrontations of the sort anticipated with the “King of Elfland.”
- P. G. Wodehouse's novels The Mating Season and The Code of the Woosters: Jeeves uses the phrase "Childe Roland to the Dark Tower came" to describe Bertie Wooster's arrival on two separate occasions. Bertie does not understand the reference either time.
- Neil Gaiman's Sandman character Charles Rowland, one of the Dead Boy Detectives, is a reference to Childe Roland, particularly in his The Children's Crusade miniseries (1993), which prominently features a dark tower, a motif later picked up by the Books of Magic series.
- Characters in Philip José Farmer's series Riverworld quote passages from the poem and make allusions to the dark tower in their quest.
- By Blood We Live, the third book in Glen Duncan's The Last Werewolf series.
- British journalist and satirist Malcolm Muggeridge compared his childhood memories of Croydon Water Tower to the poem in his memoir, Chronicles of Wasted Time (1973).
- Susan Howe argues in My Emily Dickinson that the poem is critical to Dickinson's "My Life had stood – a Loaded Gun -" (Fr 764)
- In Go Set a Watchman, by Harper Lee, Uncle Jack calls Scout Childe Roland because she is on a quest to understand why Maycomb is so different than it used to be.
- The song "The Dark Tower", by progressive metal band Sky Empire, is based in large part upon Childe Roland.
- Leah Bodine Drake's poem "Haunted Hour" (1941).
- Bernard Cornwell's novel 1356 describes the character Sir Roland de Verrec taking refuge in an abandoned church bell tower as 'in the dusk, Roland to the dark tower came'.
- American author Conrad Aiken mentions "Childe Roland, leaving behind him the dark tower" in his poem "Changing Minds".
- British indie pop band The Clientele reference the poem twice on their 2005 album Strange Geometry, on "E.M.P.T.Y" and "Impossible".
