= Lansdowne Road =

Former stadium in Dublin

- Bóthar Lansdún
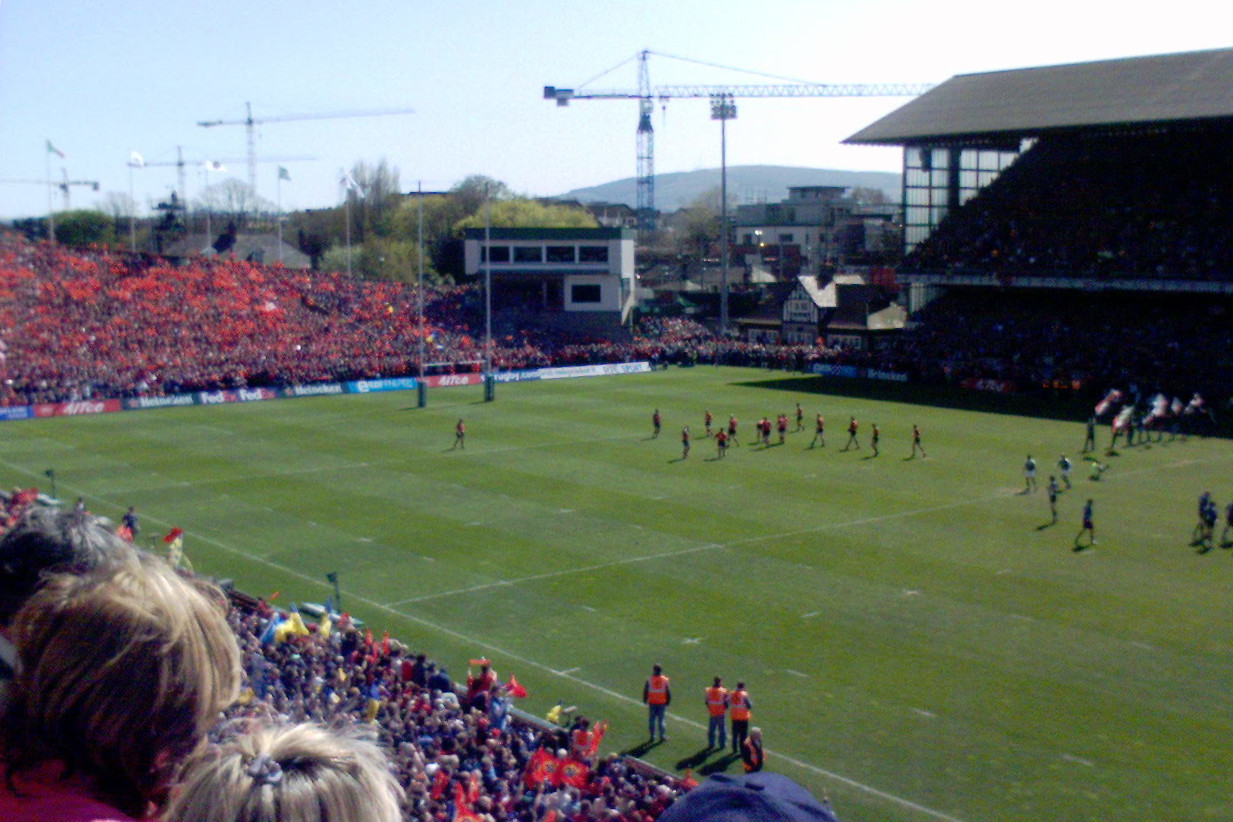
- Rugby union match between Leinster and Munster at the Lansdowne Road Stadium in April 2006

- Location within Dublin
- Location: Ballsbridge, Dublin 4, Ireland
- Coordinates: 53°20′6″N 6°13′45″W
- Owner: Irish Rugby Football Union
- Capacity: 48,000 (23,000 seated), 36,000 when all seated.
- Surface: Grass

Construction
- Opened: 1872
- Closed: 31 December 2006
- Demolished: 2007

Tenants
- Ireland national rugby union team (1872–2006); Republic of Ireland national football team (1971–2006); Leinster Rugby (1945–2006); Wanderers F.C. (rugby union) (1872–2006); Lansdowne R.F.C. (1872–2006)

Lansdowne Road Stadium (Irish: Bóthar Lansdún, IPA: [ˈbˠoːhəɾˠ ˈl̪ˠan̪ˠsˠd̪ˠuːn̪ˠ]) was a stadium in Dublin owned by the Irish Rugby Football Union (IRFU) that was primarily used for rugby union and association football matches. The stadium was demolished in 2007 to make way for the Aviva Stadium on the same site, which opened in 2010.

The stadium took its name from the adjacent street, Lansdowne Road.

== Location ==
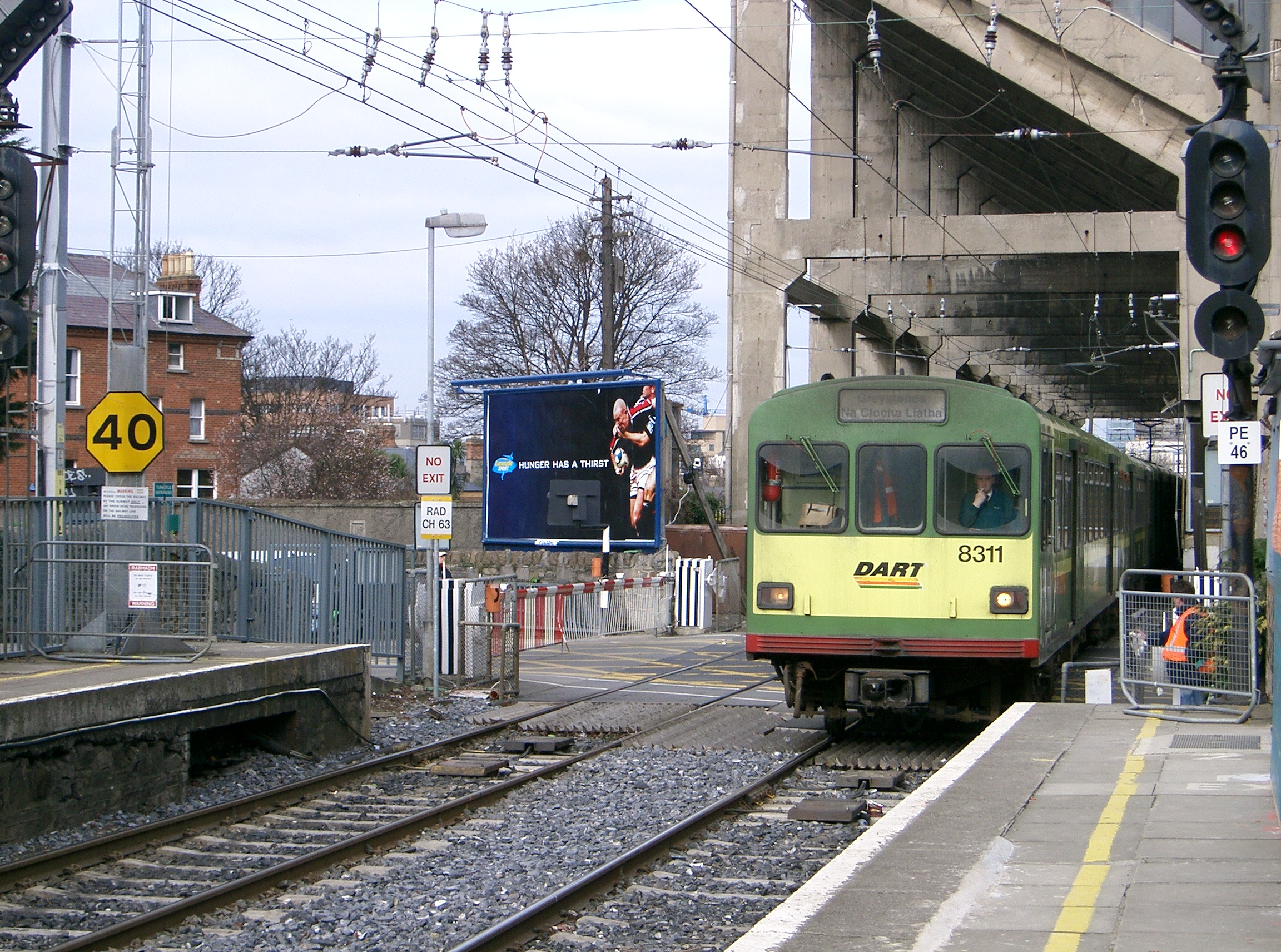
A DART train passes under the Lansdowne Road Rugby Football Stadium and over the level crossing as it enters the station of the same name.

The stadium was situated in the neighbourhood of Ballsbridge in the city's Dublin 4 area. The stadium had convenient public transport links as the Lansdowne Road station of the Dublin Area Rapid Transit rail system is adjacent to the site and passed directly underneath the West Stand.

The stadium was named after the nearby road, which in turn was named after William Petty-FitzMaurice, 1st Marquess of Lansdowne. The Marquis was also the Earl of Shelburne, and nearby Shelbourne Road is also named after him.

== Uses ==
The stadium had a total capacity of 49,250, with 25,000 seats. However, competitive international football matches could not use the entire capacity because the stands at both ends of the ground (North and South) were standing-only terraces. FIFA and UEFA both mandate that international matches be played in all-seated venues. A temporary capacity of 36,000 was the result for competitive soccer. World Rugby, known as the International Rugby Board when the current Aviva Stadium opened, does not impose this restriction on international rugby venues. For non-competitive international football matches (friendly matches), the FIFA/UEFA all-seated mandate does not apply.

At the IRFU ground, Irish rugby and football international matches were played. Leinster also used the ground on a number of occasions when crowd size meant their traditional home of Donnybrook was not large enough. In 1999 and 2003, Lansdowne Road played host to the Heineken Cup final. Since 1990, Lansdowne was also a regular host of the FAI Cup Final.

The stadium had also hosted huge concerts from artists such as Michael Jackson, Destiny's Child, Robbie Williams, Oasis, U2, The Corrs, Westlife and others.

== History ==
The Lansdowne Road Stadium was the brainchild of Henry Dunlop, the organiser of the first All Ireland Athletics Championships. Dunlop, a decorated track walker and engineering graduate of Trinity College, Dublin, founded the Irish Champion Athletic Club in 1871.

After an initial meeting at Trinity College, the Provost of the college banned any further meetings on campus. Dunlop had to find a new home for his sporting endeavours.

Dunlop founded Lansdowne Football Club in 1872 and that club has played rugby union ever since at the grounds, being one of the most prominent and successful rugby clubs in Leinster and Ireland. Wanderers Football Club, founded in 1869, joined Lansdowne at the grounds later. The two clubs were tenants since that time and also use the new Aviva Stadium.

Some 300 cartloads of soil from a trench beneath the railway were used to raise the ground, allowing Dunlop to utilise his engineering expertise to create a pitch envied around Ireland.

Rugby gradually became the main use of the grounds: the first representative rugby match was an interprovincial fixture between Leinster and Ulster in December 1876, and on 11 March 1878, Lansdowne Road hosted its first international rugby fixture, against England, making it the world's oldest rugby union Test venue. Dunlop charged the IRFU £5 and half of any profits over £50 after expenses. The first victory Ireland had at the ground took place on 5 February 1887, against England. Around this time, the treasurer of the IRFU, Harry Sheppard, acquired the lease from Dunlop and when Sheppard died in 1906, the union paid his estate £200 for the lease. The IRFU built the first covered stand in 1908, alongside the railway. An uncovered stand was built over the Lansdowne club pavilion at the northwest corner of the ground.

The first international soccer match at the venue took place between Ireland and England on Saint Patrick's Day, 17 March 1900, when the Belfast-based Irish Football Association controlled that game throughout the island. England won by 2–0. In 1926, the Irish Free State played an international game against Italy at Lansdowne Road and this was to be the last soccer game at the stadium until Waterford United played Manchester United in a European Cup tie in September 1968.

The day after the United Kingdom declared war in August 1914, 350 rugby players, of middle-class and professional backgrounds with solicitors and barristers and many working in banks and insurance companies, assembled on the ground. They were addressed by FH Browning, the President of the IRFU, and they decided to volunteer to join the 7th Royal Dublin Fusiliers as a "pals" company, D Company. They marched from the grounds through the city on their way to the Curragh Camp. Some were shortly commissioned as officers, others became NCOs and many of the others became specialists in the battalion, such as signallers, machine-gunners and medical orderlies. This unit saw action at Suvla Bay in the Dardanelles on 7 August 1915, when many of them died. A memorial to the IRFU members who died in the Great War was erected on the inside of the external wall of the stadium after the war. It was to be preserved in any rebuilding by condition of the planning permission, and is now located just outside the new Aviva Stadium media centre.

After the First World War, the members of Lansdowne and Wanderers reclaimed land from the nearby River Dodder and created enough ground for two back pitches to be formed, enabling the main pitch to be turned out around to the configuration used ever since.

In 1927, the old East Stand was built and a terrace created under it. Soldiers of the National Army filled the stand to test its strength. Unfortunately, the roof of the stand was not erected in time for the first match against Scotland. The day of the match saw torrential rain, soaking the spectators and the day was long remembered for the appalling conditions.

The Irish poet Louis MacNeice evokes the atmosphere at Lansdowne Park in the late 1930s in Rugby Football Excursion, a poem first published in 1938. MacNeice does not specify the actual occasion, but the details provided in the sixth stanza of the poem - "Eccentric scoring - Nicholson, Marshall and Unwin, / Replies by Bailey and Daly" - suggest that MacNeice was at Lansdowne Park on 12 February 1938 for a match between Ireland and England in the 1938 Home Nations Championship. Pathé News made a newsreel of this match. The newsreel shows the English and Irish teams running onto the pitch, watched by a huge crowd, followed by various shots of the match in progress.

Lansdowne Lawn Tennis Club was a tenant at the grounds and had grass tennis courts where the South Terrace was later located. During international rugby matches, the tennis courts were covered with planks of wood to allow spectators to stand and watch the rugby matches. In 1930, Lansdowne LTC left the ground to move across the Dodder river to Londonbridge Road, taking the turf from the tennis courts with them.

The IRFU, which had its offices within the stadium complex, allowed occasional other uses of the ground, including athletics (a crowd of 40,000 witnessed Olympic gold medalist Ronnie Delany run there in an international athletics meeting in the 1950s).

In 1952 Lansdowne Road hosted the first colours match between University College Dublin and Trinity College, Dublin. UCD took the honours.

In 1954, the arrangement whereby Ireland matches were shared between Ravenhill Stadium and Lansdowne Road ended with the building of the Upper West Stand at Lansdowne creating 8,000 additional seats. In future, all Ireland internationals were to be played at Lansdowne Road.

In September 1968 the first football match was played at IRFU headquarters as Waterford played Manchester United in the 1968–69 European Cup

In 1977, the old West Lower Stand was demolished and the new West Lower Stand opened in 1978. The uncovered stand at the corner of the North Terrace was demolished and terracing extended. Lansdowne FC moved their clubhouse from under that stand to a new clubhouse within the grounds, near Herbert Bridge, beside the Dodder. The mock-Tudor tearooms of Lansdowne FC reverted to the IRFU.

The East Stand replaced the Old East Stand in 1983, being financed by the sale of ten-year tickets. In October 2005, a small fire in the north terrace put the terrace out of commission for all of Ireland's Autumn internationals. This meant that people who had travelled from as far away as Australia and New Zealand could not attend the match. The terrace reopened for the first game of the 2006 Six Nations Championship.

On 20 November 1988, Boston College beat Army 38–24 in the Emerald Isle Classic, the first major NCAA American football game ever played in Europe, played before 42,525 fans at the stadium. The Irish Government estimated at the time that the game brought nearly US$30 million in spending to the local economy.

The Football Association of Ireland first leased the ground for international soccer matches in 1971, and from 1990 to 2006, the ground was used for the vast majority of home fixtures by the Republic of Ireland soccer team. The reason for this was that Dalymount Park, the traditional home of Irish soccer was no longer considered an adequate venue for hosting internationals due to its lower capacity and fewer seats. It was primarily to allow midweek international soccer matches to take place in the evening that floodlights were installed in Lansdowne in 1993.

On 15 February 1995, following the 1994 IRA ceasefire, English football hooligans caused the referee to abandon a friendly international after just 27 minutes. Orchestrated by Combat 18, a neo-Nazi organisation and members of the hooligan group Chelsea Headhunters. English spectators threw debris (including seats, wood and metal) down at Irish fans in response to a goal being scored by Ireland's David Kelly.

In 2004, Shelbourne made it to the final qualifying round of the UEFA Champions League and played La Liga side Deportivo La Coruña at Lansdowne Road in front of 25,000. The match finished 0:0, and following defeat in Spain in the second leg, Shels would host their UEFA Cup first round tie against Lille at Lansdowne as well. That match finished 2:2.

The last international rugby match before demolition was a 61–17 Ireland win over the Pacific Islanders on 26 November 2006. The final football international was a 5–0 win for the Republic of Ireland over San Marino on 15 November 2006. The last football game ever before redevelopment was Derry City's FAI Cup Final win against St. Patrick's Athletic on 3 December 2006.

The last contest in the old Lansdowne Road Stadium was a rugby match that took place on 31 December 2006. Leinster beat Ulster 20 points to 12 in a Celtic League game that set a record attendance of 48,000 for such a league match. Demolition of the stadium began in May 2007.

== Replacement ==
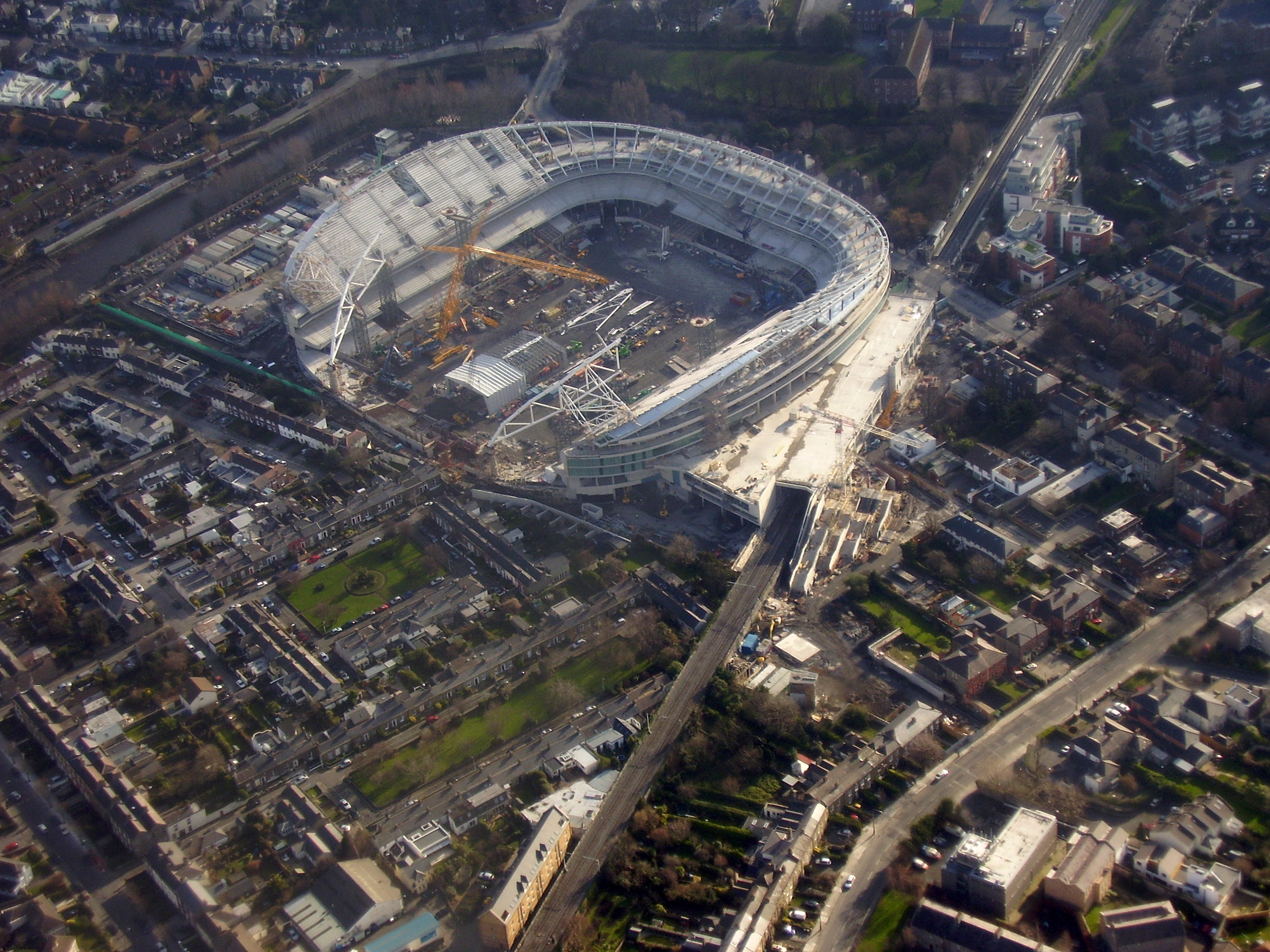
Lansdowne Road was replaced by the Aviva Stadium, shown here during construction

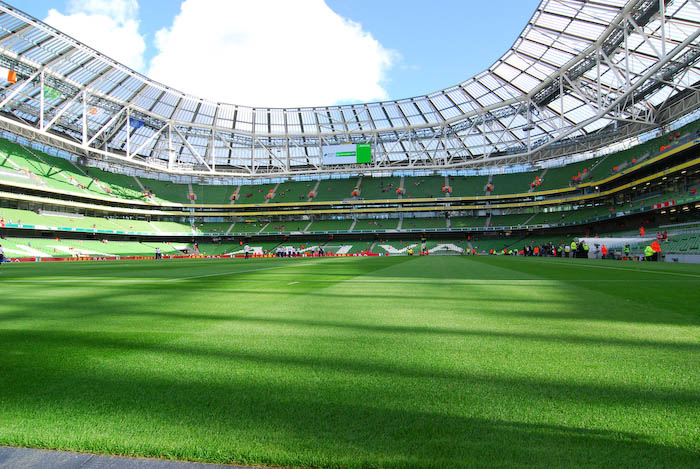
The inside of the Aviva Stadium, after construction

The stadium was replaced by a 50,000 all-seater football and rugby stadium that opened in May 2010. The development of the new stadium was finally announced in January 2004 at a cost of approximately €365 million; of this, €190 million came from the Irish government, with the remainder paid by the IRFU and Football Association of Ireland. The new stadium was designed by Populous, Scott Tallon Walker and Buro Happold, with ME Engineers providing the building services design. The development was originally meant to begin in January 2007. but was delayed. DSM Demolition commenced the works on 17 May 2007.

Football and rugby internationals were mainly played at Croke Park while the Aviva Stadium was being developed, with fixtures in both sports also taking place at Thomond Park, and RDS Arena with Ravenhill Stadium also hosting a rugby international. Croke Park is owned by the Gaelic Athletic Association, whose previous rules did not allow foreign sports to be played on their grounds.

In September 2006, Lars-Christer Olsson, CEO of UEFA, hinted that the new stadium might stage the UEFA Cup Final in 2010. The 2010 final was ultimately awarded to Hamburg, but in January 2009, UEFA named the new ground as the host stadium for the renamed 2011 Europa League Final.

In February 2009, a sponsorship deal, reported to be in the region of €44 million for 10 years, was struck under which the new stadium would be known as Aviva Stadium, which opened on 7 August 2010.

== In popular culture ==
The writer Gerard Siggins co-authored the history of the stadium, Lansdowne Road: The Stadium, The Matches, The Greatest Days (O'Brien Press, 2010) with journalist Malachy Clerkin.

== See also ==
- Stadiums of Ireland

Preceded by Stade Lescure; Bordeaux	Heineken Cup; Final Venue; 1998-99	Succeeded by Twickenham; London
Preceded by Millennium Stadium; Cardiff	Heineken Cup; Final Venue; 2002-03	Succeeded by Twickenham; London
