= The Dark Tower (radio play) =

- Written by: Louis MacNeice
- Based on: Childe Roland to the Dark Tower Came by Robert Browning
- Music by: Benjamin Britten
- Genre: Radio play

Premiere
- Date: 26 January 1946
- Official website

The Dark Tower is a 1946 BBC Home Service radio play written, in verse, and produced by Louis MacNeice, with music composed for it by Benjamin Britten. Dramatist and author Robin Brooks, writing in The Guardian in 2017, called it "a landmark in radio drama".

MacNeice wrote the play in the autumn of 1945. At the time, he was still badly shaken by the wartime death of a schoolfriend, Graham Shepard, (Note: Graham Shepard was the son of the artist E. H. Shepard. Shepard's ship HMS Polyanthus was sunk in September 1943 in the Battle of the Atlantic) and had what might be termed survivor guilt. Britten had previously written the music for MacNeice's The Agamemnon of Aeschylus (1936), and Out of the Picture (1937). MacNeice asked Britten to write music for The Dark Tower "with the greatest economy".

The play was first broadcast on 21 January 1946, a Monday, at 9:15pm. It was introduced as "a parable play on the ancient theme of the Quest, suggested by Robert Browning's poem Childe Roland to the Dark Tower Came". The cast included Cyril Cusack as Roland and Olga Lindo as The Mother. The "ad hoc" orchestra was conducted by Walter Goehr, conductor of the BBC Theatre Orchestra.

The play was published by Faber and Faber as The Dark Tower and Other Radio Scripts (1947). MacNeice dedicated the published script to Britten.

As part of MacNeice's centenary year (2007), Roma Tomelty and Centre Stage Theatre Company, based in Belfast, Northern Ireland, presented the radio play with an original score composed and performed by Mark McGrath.

Robin Brooks produced a recreation of the first broadcast performance, with the BBC Concert Orchestra, at Orford Church, Suffolk, as part of the 2017 Britten Weekend. The performance was itself broadcast on BBC Radio 3.

The audio recording of the original 1946 broadcast is available to stream and is the oldest complete programme made available by the BBC, online. (Note: Wart and the Hawks, a single episode of the six-part adaptation of the T. H. White novel The Sword In The Stone, made in 1939, is also available. It too has music by Britten.) It has a running time of 1 hour, 13 minutes.
