= The Burglar's Christmas =

1896 short story by Willa Cather

- Short story by Elizabeth L. Seymour (Willa Cather)
- Country: United States
- Language: English
- Genre: Short story

Publication
- Published in: Home Monthly
- Publication type: Women's magazine
- Publication date: 1896

"The Burglar's Christmas" is a short story by Willa Cather. It was first published in Home Monthly in 1896 under the pseudonym of Elizabeth L. Seymour, her cousin's name.

== Plot summary ==
Out in Chicago on Christmas Eve, two shabby-looking men are considering getting food after they have not been eating for days. Crawford is too tired to walk however, so the other man goes off by himself. Crawford considers stealing the food as he cannot pay for it, but when a woman drops a parcel he gives it to her instead of running off with it. He feels as if he is a failed thief, in the same manner as he has failed at everything - college, journalism, real estate, performing. He then walks into a house in an attempt to steal the jewellery, and his mother finds him there. She says she forgives him for everything; his father remains distant. They have dinner and he feels warm again.

== Characters ==
- Crawford, a shabby-looking man. Crawford is not his real name.
- William, Helen and James's son, who run away from college for years.
- A woman who drops a parcel in the street.
- Helen, William's mother.
- James, William's father. Helen says he is 'undemonstrative'.
- Ellen, a woman Helen mentions.

== Allusions to other works ==
- The text mentions in passing Robert Browning's 1855 poem Childe Roland to the Dark Tower Came and the Dance of Death.
- William performed in a theatrical adaptation of Harriet Beecher Stowe's 1852 novel Uncle Tom's Cabin.

== Literary significance and criticism ==
It has been argued by critic Sharon O'Brien that this rewriting of the prodigal son theme bears some resemblance to Willa Cather's own relationship with her mother.
