= Childe =

Chivalric rank

In the Middle Ages, a childe or child (from Old English: Cild "Young Lord") was a nobleman's son who had not yet attained knighthood or had not yet won his spurs. As a rank in chivalry it was used as a title, e.g. Child Horn in King Horn, whilst a male progressed through the positions of squire and then knight. The term is now obsolete in standard English but is still well known from poetry, such as Robert Browning's Childe Roland to the Dark Tower Came and Lord Byron's Childe Harold's Pilgrimage.

However, the word is still used in the local Doric dialect of north-east Scotland. Here it may be directly translated as 'fellow' or 'man' into Standard English. For example, a working childe would mean a working man, while a dour childe would indicate a taciturn individual.

== Cultural references ==
The term is used in application to an expected next stage in human evolution in the Childe Cycle novels by Gordon R. Dickson.

Childe in Stephen King's The Dark Tower is, in Roland Deschain's own words, "... a term that describes a knight – or a gunslinger – on a quest. A formal term, and ancient. We never used it among ourselves ... for it means holy, chosen by ka. We never liked to think of ourselves in such terms, and I haven't thought of myself so in many years." (p. 859, The Dark Tower VII: The Dark Tower, Pocket Books, 2006 ed.)
