= The Sunlight on the Garden =

1936 poem by Irish author Louis MacNeice

- by Louis MacNeice
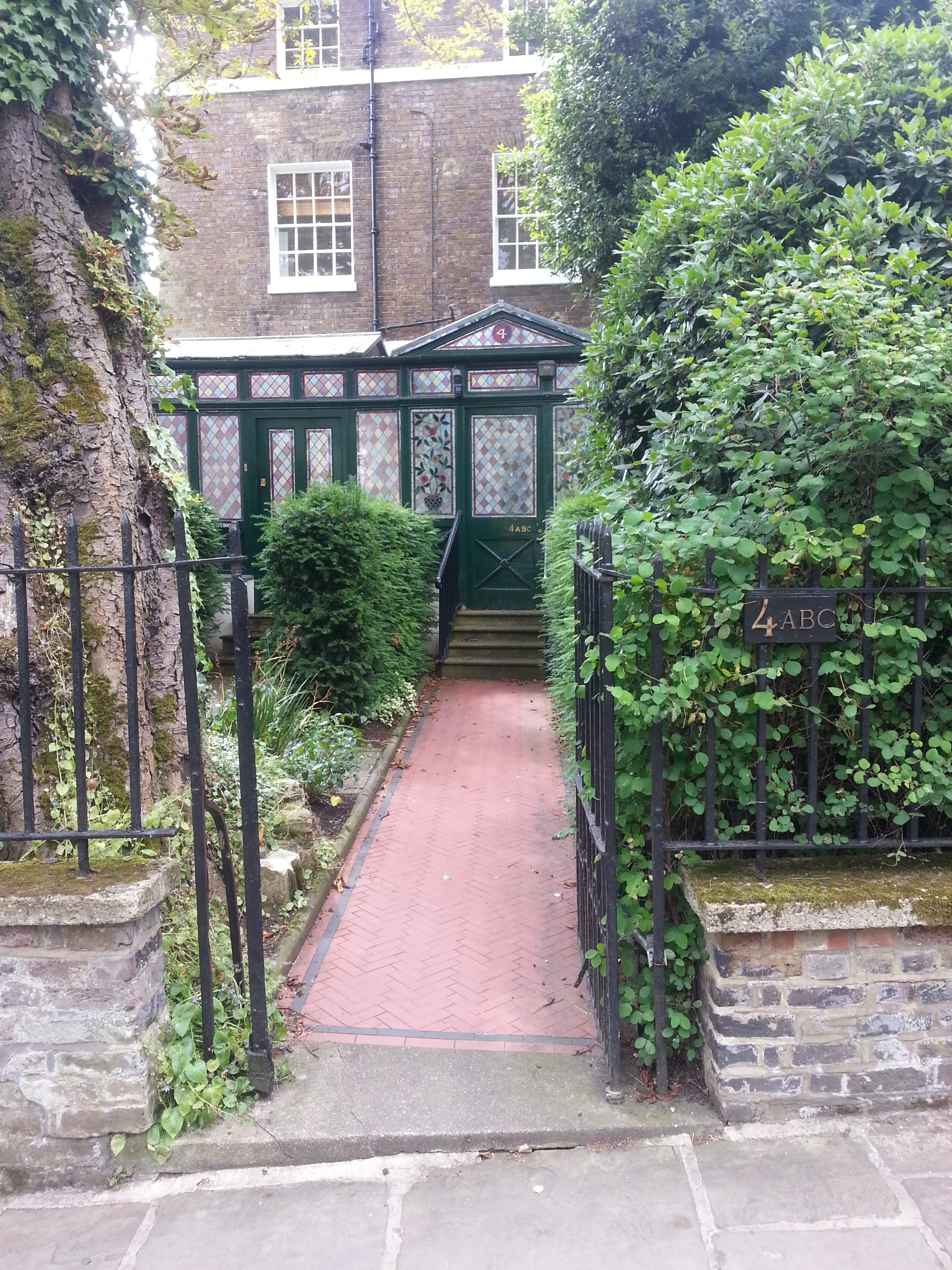
- Entrance to 4 Keats Grove, Hampstead, London. It was while living here that Louis MacNeice wrote The Sunlight on the Garden
- Original title: Song
- Written: 1936
- First published in: The Listener magazine, January 1937
- Language: English

The Sunlight on the Garden is a 24-line poem by Louis MacNeice. It was written in late 1936 and was entitled Song at its first appearance in print, in The Listener magazine, January 1937. It was first published in book form as the third poem in MacNeice's poetry collection The Earth Compels (1938). The poem explores themes of time and loss, along with anxiety about the darkening political situation in Europe following the outbreak of the Spanish Civil War. It is one of the best known and most anthologized of MacNeice's short poems. George MacBeth describes it as "one of MacNeice's saddest and most beautiful lyrics".

== Biographical background ==
According to Jon Stallworthy, Louis MacNeice wrote The Sunlight on the Garden as a "love-song" for his first wife, Mary Ezra, shortly after their divorce was finalised in November 1936. Mary had left MacNeice for Charles Katzman in November 1935, and she followed Katzman to America early the next year. MacNeice was initially "devastated". However, by the time the divorce was finalised, MacNeice was able to contemplate the end of his marriage with acceptance (as in the first stanza of The Sunlight on the Garden) and to remember his time with Mary with gratitude (as in the last stanza). At the same time that MacNeice wrote The Sunlight on the Garden he was collaborating with W. H. Auden on Letters from Iceland, and in Last Will and Testament from Letters from Iceland MacNeice shows a similar spirit of generosity towards Mary:

Lastly to Mary living in a remote
Country I leave whatever she would remember
Of hers and mine before she took that boat,

Such memories not being necessarily lumber
And may no chance, unless she wills, delete them
And may her hours be gold and without number.

On 6 November 1936, four days after the divorce was finalised, MacNeice moved into a flat at 4 Keats Grove, Hampstead, London. (The previous occupant of the flat was the poet and critic Geoffrey Grigson, and the flat was just fifty yards along the road from Keats House, the house once occupied by the poet John Keats). The Sunlight on the Garden was written while MacNeice was living at 4a Keats Grove, and as Jon Stallworthy notes, 4a was a 'garden flat'; "the three principal rooms of the flat faced south and, even in November, were lit by the low sun striking through the branches of two large sycamores at the back of the garden.". Stallworthy associates The Sunlight on the Garden with the garden of 4 Keats Grove and other gardens MacNeice had known, going back to the garden at Carrickfergus Rectory where MacNeice had spent his childhood.

== Form ==
The sunlight on the garden
Hardens and grows cold,
We cannot cage the minute
Within its nets of gold,
When all is told
We cannot beg for pardon.

— "The Sunlight on the Garden", Stanza 1

The Sunlight on the Garden is a poem of four stanzas, each of six lines. It is a highly formal poem, and has been much admired as an example of MacNeice's poetic technique. All the lines are loose three-beat lines or trimeters, except for the fifth line of each stanza, which is a dimeter. The rhyme scheme is ABCBBA. The A rhyme in the first stanza ("garden/pardon") returns in the final stanza, but with the words reversed ("pardon/garden"). In addition to end rhyme, MacNeice makes use of internal rhyme, rhyming the end of the first line with the beginning of the second line ("lances/Advances") and the end of the third line with the beginning of the fourth line ("under/Thunder"). George MacBeth comments that the rhyme scheme "has the effect of dovetailing the lines together and producing a constant sense of echo emphasising the lingering, fading quality of the joys of life which the poem is talking about."

Jon Stallworthy also comments on the effect of the rhyme scheme: "The poem, propelled by its insistent rhymes, seems to move in a circle that, on closer inspection, proves to be a spiral; its end revealing a knowledge, a wisdom, not present at its beginning.".
