= Christopher Columbus (play) =

1942 radio play by Louis MacNeice

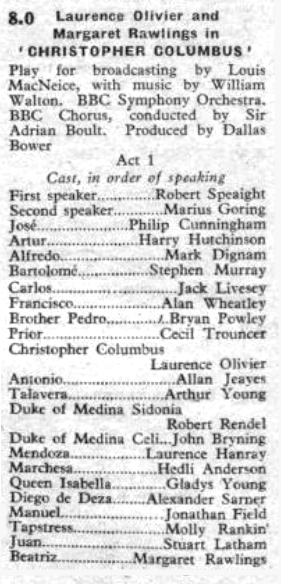
First performance, 1942

Christopher Columbus is a radio play, with text by Louis MacNeice and music by William Walton, commissioned by the BBC in 1942. It was first heard in a live broadcast in October 1942 on the BBC Home Service. Sir Adrian Boult conducted the BBC Symphony Orchestra, and the cast was headed by Laurence Olivier in the title role. The production was greatly admired on both sides of the Atlantic, but Walton was reluctant to have his incidental music played in concert or on record and only one number from the score was published in his lifetime. Since his death in 1983 the score of Christopher Columbus has been arranged into a cantata and a suite, published and recorded. The BBC broadcast a new production of the play in 1992.

== Background and broadcast ==
The producer and director Dallas Bower, then working for the BBC, produced a radio adaptation of Alexander Nevsky in 1941 shortly after the Soviet Union entered the Second World War. The adaptation was made in response to a request from the British government for a broadcast gesture to the country's new ally. The production, broadcast live, used Prokofiev's music from the original film; Sir Adrian Boult conducted the BBC Symphony Orchestra and Chorus. In late 1941 the United States also joined the war, following the Japanese attack on Pearl Harbor. Bower proposed to follow his Alexander Nevsky with a radio play celebrating America, and commissioned Louis MacNeice to write the words and William Walton to compose the music. As the 450th anniversary of Christopher Columbus's discovery of America was to be celebrated on 12 October 1942, the BBC chose that date for the broadcast of the new play.

The cast of the play was headed by Laurence Olivier in the title role; the supporting cast included well-known actors such as Marius Goring, Stephen Murray, Robert Speaight, Cecil Trouncer and Alan Wheatley, but apart from Columbus the only other major role is Beatriz, his lover. Bowers had wanted Vivien Leigh for the part, but the BBC's casting office mistakenly believed that her contract with her film studios barred her from broadcasting, and Margaret Rawlings was given the role. Christopher Columbus was broadcast from Bedford, where Boult and the orchestra were temporarily based. The soloists in the two songs in the score were Joan Lennard (soprano) and Bradbridge White (tenor). The chorus was augmented by a further thirty singers. The transmission was live, but the BBC made a recording, using the Philips-Miller process, which allowed higher-quality reproduction than other recording methods then available. Walton was unwell and could not attend the performance, but Bowers later played him the recording and the composer commented that the piece was "not too bad, really". The historian Asa Briggs has written that the work "created a sensation in artistic circles on both sides of the Atlantic".

The play, with Walton's music, received two further broadcasts. In 1973 the BBC transmitted a repeat of the 1942 recording, and in 1992 BBC Radio 3 presented a new version of the piece. Simon Joly conducted the BBC Symphony Orchestra and BBC Singers in the music; the two main roles were played by Alan Howard and Hannah Gordon and the supporting cast included Michael Aldridge, Jill Balcon, Elizabeth Bell, Robert Eddison, John Moffatt and Brett Usher.

== Music ==
Having the full resources of the BBC, Walton was able to write for a large orchestra. The music is scored for three flutes, three oboes, three clarinets, three bassoons, four horns, three trumpets, three trombones, tuba and percussion comprising timpani, side drum, cymbals, tambourine, castanets, bass drum and gong.

Walton held firm views about incidental music for plays, films and broadcasts: "film music is not good film music if it can be used for any other purpose ... the music should never be heard without the film". He had approached Christopher Columbus music as not "in any way different from a rather superior film". Asked to allow any of the music to be published, he responded, "I can't believe that there is anything worth resuscitating from that vast and boring score". In 1974 he was again asked about the possible publication of Beatriz's song, "When Will He Return?". The critic Gillian Widdicombe, having heard the rebroadcast of the 1942 production, urged him to publish the song, saying it was "really beautiful". Walton responded, "If it was as beautiful as all that I should remember it", but he agreed to let it be published.

After Walton's death the musicologist Christopher Palmer arranged a three-movement suite from Walton's incidental music. The movements are:

1. Fiesta (chorus and orchestra, and then purely orchestral): A royal procession passes in triumph through the streets; crowds cheer and drums and trumpets sound. Columbus looks forward to the day of his return to Spain having done what "cannot be done".
2. Romanza: (mezzo-soprano and orchestra): Beatriz sings sadly of her love for Columbus who is too focused on his ambitions to return her love as she would wish.
3. Gloria (tenor, chorus and orchestra}: Columbus, having discovered the New World, returns to Spain and is greeted as a hero.

In 1988 Carl Davis arranged music from Christopher Columbus as a cantata, for mezzo-soprano, tenor, baritone, chorus and orchestra. In 2005 Chandos Records released a recording containing all of Walton's music for the play with an abbreviated version of MacNeice's words. Richard Hickox conducts the BBC National Chorus of Wales and the BBC National Orchestra of Wales. Julian Glover speaks Columbus's lines.

== Critical reception ==
In a 1999 study of the work, Zelda Lawrence-Curran writes:

Christopher Columbus would certainly be a candidate if awards were to be given for the least discussed Walton score. ... [F]ew critics or writers on music have given the work more than a passing mention. I suspect this apparent neglect is, in the main, due to the lack of performance of the play which is both long (over two hours), requires large resources and is subject specific, there being only a few dates in the calendar to which the topic of the discovery of America could be relevant.

The critic Michael Kennedy writes that the play is characteristic of radio-drama of the day:

ambitious, high-flown, sometimes banal (as in the Portland Place Mummerset speech of the lower-class Spaniards), yet with a loftiness of aim that compels admiration. ... Columbus represents BBC radio-drama at its serious best.

== Sources ==
- Craggs, Stewart R. (1990). William Walton: A Catalogue. Oxford: Oxford University Press. ISBN 978-0-19-315474-2.
- Kennedy, Michael (1989). Portrait of Walton. Oxford: Oxford University Press. ISBN 978-0-19-816705-1.
- Lawrence-Curran, Zelda (1999). "Christopher Columbus". In Stewart R. Craggs (ed.). William Walton: Music and Literature. Aldershot: Ashgate. ISBN 1-85928-190-7.
- Lloyd, Stephen (2002). William Walton: Muse of Fire. Woodbridge: Boydell. ISBN 978-0-85115-803-7.
