= Letters from Iceland =

1937 book by W. H. Auden and Louis MacNeice

First edition

Letters from Iceland is a travel book in prose and verse by W. H. Auden and Louis MacNeice, published in 1937. Auden revised his sections of the book for a new edition published in 1967.

The book is made up of a series of letters and travel notes by Auden and MacNeice written during their trip to Iceland in 1936 compiling light-hearted private jokes and irreverent comments about their surrounding world.

Auden's contributions include the poem "Journey to Iceland"; a prose section "For Tourists"; a five-part verse "Letter to Lord Byron"; a selection of writings on Iceland by other authors, "Sheaves from Sagaland"; a prose letter to "E. M. Auden" (E. M. was Erika Mann), which included his poems "Detective Story" and "O who can ever praise enough"; a prose letter to Kristian Andreirsson, Esq.; a free-verse letter to William Coldstream, and, in collaboration with MacNeice, "W. H. Auden and Louis MacNeice: Their Last Will and Testament" (in verse).

MacNeice's contributions include a verse letter to Graham and Anne Shepard; the satiric prose "Hetty to Nancy" (unsigned); a verse Epilogue; and his work on "W. H. Auden and Louis MacNeice: Their Last Will and Testament".

Letters from Iceland is categorised under the "Inter-war pastorals" style of writing, where poets are attached to an imaginary countryside from where they contemplate people, literature and politics.

== Legacy ==
In 1994, poets Simon Armitage and Glyn Maxwell visited Iceland for a documentary for BBC Radio 3, Second Draft from Sagaland, and wrote a follow-up book to Auden and MacNeice's, entitled Moon Country: Further Reports from Iceland.
