= Sherborne Preparatory School =

Sherborne Prep School
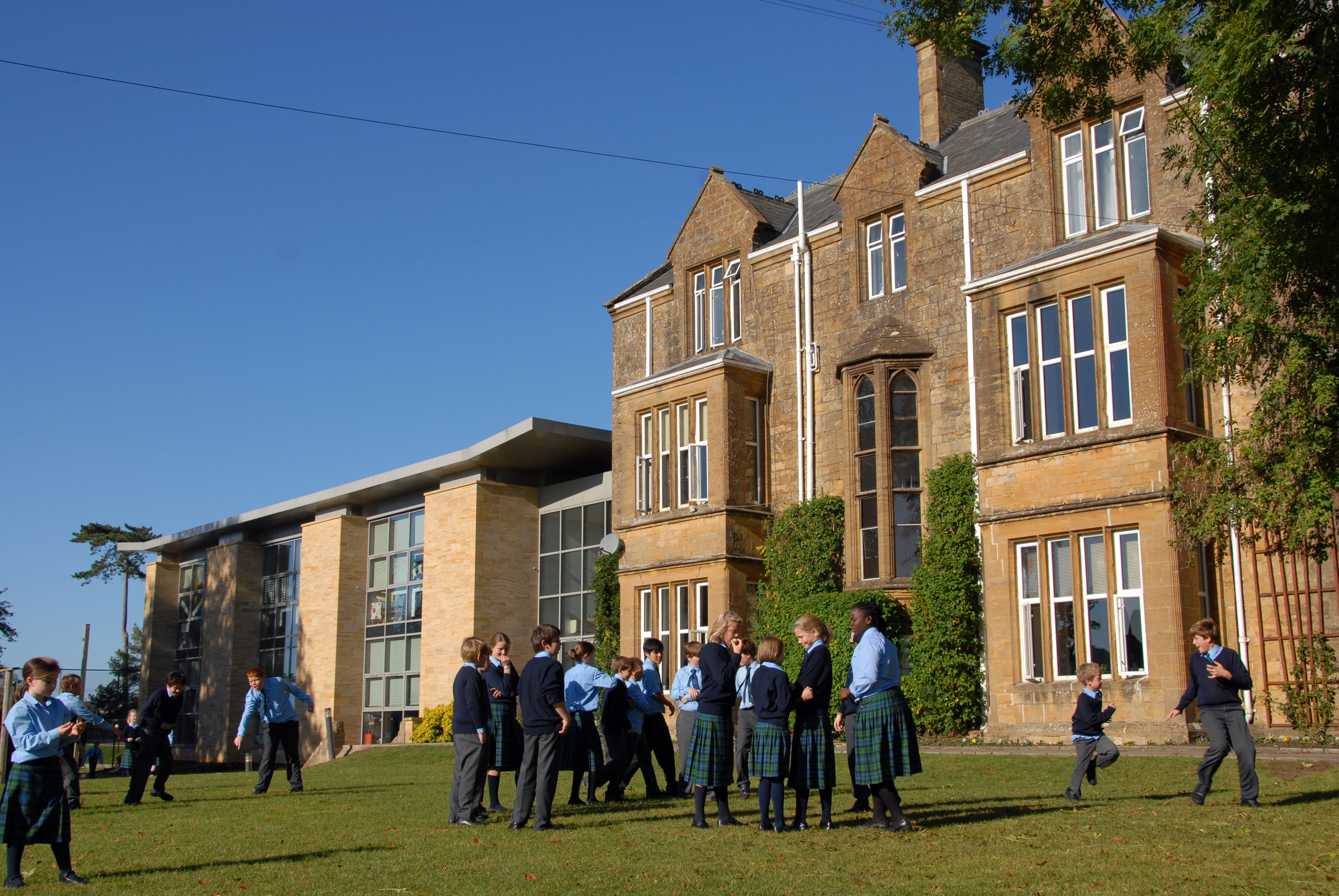

Location
- Acreman St; Sherborne, Dorset, DT9 3NY; England
- 50.94712°N 2.52091°W

Information
- Type: Private preparatory day and boarding
- Motto: Non Nobis Solum (Not for ourselves alone)
- Religious affiliation: Church of England
- Established: 1858; 168 years ago
- Founder: Rev. Alfred C. Clapin
- Chief Executive: Christopher Samler
- Head: Annie Gent
- Gender: Co-educational
- Age: 3 to 13
- Enrolment: 210
- Houses: Normans, Romans, Greeks, Trojans
- Colours: Blue and red
- Website: www.sherborneprep.org

Sherborne Prep School is a non-selective co-educational preparatory school in the town of Sherborne, Dorset, in southern England. In July 2024, the two charitable trusts that own Sherborne Prep, Sherborne Boys, Sherborne Girls and Hanford School, formally merged into one charity called the Sherborne Schools Group.

Pupils generally go on to other independent schools with a large proportion moving onto the Sherborne Schools as well as other schools, predominantly in South West England.

== History ==
Sherborne Prep was founded in 1858 by Reverend Alfred C. Clapin, who was a housemaster at Sherborne School. The headmaster Hugo Harper had asked him to establish a junior house at the school to educate younger boys. The school outgrew its premises over the next few decades. In 1885, it moved out to its own premises and became a fully independent preparatory school. It became coeducational during the 1970s, following a trend set by many previously single-sex independent schools. Until 1998, it was privately run before being turned over to a charitable trust. The school merged with Sherborne School in April 2021.

== Present school ==
The school is divided into three parts: Nursery, Pre-Prep and Prep.

=== Nursery ===
Taking children from three years of age, the Nursery facility is located within the grounds of the school with sessions starting at 8.15am and finishing at 3.45pm with an option to stay until 5:00pm in the Pre-Prep facility.

=== Pre-Prep ===
From Reception to Year 2, children are taught a broad curriculum with languages, music, IT, sport, and swimming taught by subject specialists. In Year 1, the children begin Inspire Maths, a Singapore approach to teaching mathematics. Languages are taught using the communicative approach. Reception children also have lessons in conversational Italian. All Pre-Prep children take part in some form of physical activity every day including aerobics, gymnastics, tennis, hockey, netball, rounders, football, tag rugby and athletics.

== Core values ==
The school has six core values: kindness, perseverance, awareness, generosity, honesty, and independence.

== Boarding ==
Full, Weekly and Occasional Boarding is offered from Year 3 upwards. The boarding house is located within the centre of the school and is a co-ed facility with girls and boys sharing joint common rooms, overseen by a Housemaster, his wife and three children who live in separate accommodation within the boarding house.

=== Houses ===
The school has four houses; Normans, Greeks, Trojans and Romans. Day pupils are also assigned a house, and boarders do not live in their 'houses' as at senior schools.

== Facilities and activities ==
The campus is made up of one main building containing the Prep Classrooms, an Art Room, ICT Suite, Library, Assembly and Dining Hall, Music Rooms, and Sports Hall. The Boarding House is contained within this building. Science and DT are in a separate building, as is the Pre-Prep and Nursery Facility. The grounds also contain a playground, pond dipping area, an Astro Turf, 2 x netball courts, and a large sports field. For Rugby, Hockey, Cricket, Climbing and Bouldering, the Prep also use the Sherborne Boys and Sherborne Sports Centre facilities.

There are a lunchtime clubs including dance, Latin, and lacrosse as well as numerous music clubs, including choir, strings group and recorder clubs. Extra-curricular clubs are offered both at lunch times and after school between 3.45pm and 5pm.

=== Music ===
Music is part of the curriculum, including individual music lessons. The school has various chamber groups: Digby Brass Ensemble, Chamber Orchestra, String Ensemble, Woodwind Ensemble, Choirs and Maestro's. Pupils have a variety of concert opportunities in the music department.

== Alumni ==
The school has a distinguished literary history, with a number of prominent writers attending the school, most notably John Cowper Powys and Louis MacNeice.

== Historical abuse allegations ==
Sherborne Prep featured in an ITV documentary Boarding Schools: The Secret Shame, with broadcaster and journalist Alex Renton, in February 2018. Three survivors of child abuse spoke about their experience of Robin Lindsay, who practised abuse across three decades or more while headmaster at the school. The MP for West Dorset, Rt Hon. Sir Oliver Letwin, has supported calls for an inquiry into the handling of the allegations by the police and authorities. In April 2018, Dorset's Police and Crime Commissioner ruled out an inquiry, saying he did not believe a new inquiry would "further justice".

A 1993 report by Dorset Social Services was released by Dorset County Council in April 2018 following a Freedom of Information request by Somerset Live. The report confirmed that the Department for Education and police department had records regarding complaints about Lindsay's behaviour towards boarders in 1974, 1982, 1985 and 1986. The report raised questions regarding his suitability as headmaster, yet despite this Lindsay remained in post for another five years. A later report in 1997 said to be "damning in the extreme" was lost or destroyed. He was banned from teaching in 1998 by the Department for Education which found him to be a "fixated paedophile".

A teacher at the school went to the police in 1985 to report allegations of abuse by Lindsay. He also approached the Independent Association of Preparatory Schools. But the chair at the time, Robin Peverett, did not assist, and according to reports in Devon Live the teacher was "warned off and threatened". Peverett, headmaster of Dulwich Preparatory School until his retirement in 1990, later admitted nine counts of indecent assault on girls and a boy aged 11 to 13 between 1969 and 1978 and received an 18-month suspended sentence.

The school was approached by IISCA in November 2018 to confirm and provide information across a number of lines of inquiry under the Closed Schools Inquiry, which it did both willingly and openly. IISCA recognised that despite having the same name, that the School under investigation was owned by a proprietorial Headmaster, Robin Lindsay, and is now closed. The current School, despite having the same name, is a registered charity. It is a different organisation to the one that existed prior to 1998: It is an entirely different legal, financial and governance entity. The Governing Board believe that it is important to be transparent and support the Inquiry with any information that it has. As a consequence, the school applied to be a core participant. Having done so, the Inquiry recognised that the School is a different entity to the one that existed when the allegations took place.

On 5 October 2018, it was announced by IICSA the Independent Inquiry into Child Sex Abuse, that Sherborne Prep would be one of the schools investigated within the Residential Schools Investigation.
