= Nancy Spender =

British painter

Nancy Culliford Spender (née Sharp, formerly Coldstream; 29 October 1909 – 20 June 2001) was a British painter, described on her death as "much underrated".

== Biography ==
Nancy Sharp was born on 29 October 1909 in Truro, Cornwall, the daughter of Dr Hugh Culliford Sharp, C.B.E., medical officer for the city of Truro. Her grandfather, Edward Sharp, had been a surgeon at Truro. She attended Cheltenham Ladies' College and the Slade School of Art from 1928 to 1931. At the Slade, she met and married her first husband, William Coldstream, with whom she had two daughters.

In the late 1930s she had an affair with Louis MacNeice, illustrating two of his books and partially inspiring Autumn Journal. She met Michael Spender (brother of the poet Stephen Spender) at this time, and fell in love. In 1942, she divorced Coldstream and married Spender. She worked as an ambulance driver during the Second World War with the London Auxiliary Ambulance Service and her son Philip Spender was born in 1943. Her second husband was killed in an air crash during the last week of the war in Europe. She took up work as an art teacher, which she continued till 1977, teaching at schools in Lambeth and Bromley.

Nancy Spender's portrait paintings, still lifes and landscapes were painted in a figurative, realist manner. She exhibited regularly with the London Group and at the Royal Academy of Arts. After her retirement she increased her output of paintings and etchings. She was a committee member of the Artists' International Association for five years and also showed works with the Women's International Art Club. Having little interest in commercial sales, she did not have her first solo exhibition until 1979, which was held in a West End gallery run by a friend.

Nancy Spender died on 20 June 2001 aged 91.

Two of her portraits are now in the collection of the London's National Portrait Gallery and another is held at Sir John Soane's Museum. Both the Government Art Collection and the Ashmolean Museum in Oxford also have paintings by Spender.
