= Autumn Journal =

1939 long poem by Louis MacNeice

- The poem's first edition
- Author: Louis MacNeice
- Language: English
- Genre: Long poem of 24 sections
- Publisher: Faber and Faber (London)
- Publication date: 1939
- Media type: Print

Autumn Journal is an autobiographical long poem in twenty-four sections by Louis MacNeice. It was written between August and December 1938, and published as a single volume by Faber and Faber in May 1939. Written in a discursive form, it sets out to record the author's state of mind as the approaching World War II seems more and more inevitable. Fifteen years later, MacNeice attempted a similar personal evaluation of the post-war period in his Autumn Sequel.

== "There will be time to audit the accounts later" ==
While MacNeice was still revising his long poem, he sent a tentative description of it to T. S. Eliot at Faber and Faber for publicity purposes. This mentioned that it was "written from August to December 1938" and contained 24 "sections averaging about 80 lines in length. This division gives it a dramatic quality, as different parts of myself … can be given their say in turn". In addition "it is written throughout in an elastic kind of quatrain. This form (a) gives the whole poem a formal unity but (b) saves it from monotony by allowing it a great range of appropriate variations". Not only do line-lengths vary there but the writing is rhythmic and avoids an iambic norm. It is, the author thinks, "my best work to date; it is both a panorama and a confession of faith".

When the book was published in May 1939, a prefatory note of justification for his subjective and fragmentary approach was provided:

I am aware that there are over-statements in this poem – e.g. in the passages dealing with Ireland, the Oxford by-election or my own more private existence. There are also inconsistencies.

If I had been writing a didactic poem proper, it would have been my job to qualify or eliminate these over-statements and inconsistencies. But I was writing what I have called a Journal. In a journal or a personal letter a man writes what he feels at the moment; to attempt scientific truthfulness would be – paradoxically – dishonest … I was writing it from August 1938 until the New Year and have not altered any passages relating to public events in the light of what happened after the time of writing. Thus the section about Barcelona having been written before the fall of Barcelona, I should consider it dishonest to have qualified it retrospectively by my reactions to the later event. Nor am I attempting to offer what so many people now demand from poets – a final verdict or a balanced judgment. It is the nature of this poem to be neither final nor balanced. I have certain beliefs which, I hope, emerge in the course of it but which I have refused to abstract from their context. For this reason I shall probably be called a trimmer by some and a sentimental extremist by others. But poetry in my opinion must be honest before anything else and I refuse to be 'objective' or clear-cut at the cost of honesty.

This approach was in line with the thinking in MacNeice's book-length essay published the year before, Modern Poetry: a personal essay, in which he makes "a plea for impure poetry, that is, for poetry conditioned by the poet's life and the world around him" and asserts that "the poet's first business is mentioning things". Its documentary intent is further underlined by the variety of poetic modes and authorial voices assumed as well as echoes of “propaganda films and radio broadcasts”.

Among the things mentioned in Autumn Journal are details of life in London as it prepares itself for war; the reception of the Munich Agreement (section V); the Oxford by-election fought on the issue of appeasement (section XIV); and visits to Spain during its civil war (sections VI, XXIII). Intermixed with these more or less public and political events are more personal themes: memories of his schooldays (section X); of teaching in Birmingham (section VIII); of his broken marriage and subsequent love affair with Nancy Coldstream; denunciation of both sides of divided Ireland (section XVI); the poetry and philosophy of his academic subject, Ancient Greece. But from such excursions into the past he always returns to the context of the political and personal present. Peter Macdonald has also noted that the overriding mood in the poem is a sense of loss – of youthful illusions, of love, of personal integrity. As a counterweight MacNeice concludes with admiration for the unbroken spirit of the people of besieged Barcelona, bombed daily and in a state of almost total deprivation, which reproaches his own and the national complacency and self-indulgence.

The intrusion of meditations on Aristotelian concepts is made the basis for criticism of what is happening in the present and also provides the framework of what MacNeice considers the poem should be achieving. It does not strive towards a finished vision but should be a representation of the flux of the present always in motion. This is the justification of his claim in the preface that "It is the nature of this poem to be neither final nor balanced". The repetitive process of time itself thus allows him to trace similar patterns in the poem and to move between past and future while remaining always conscious of the fluid nature of the present.

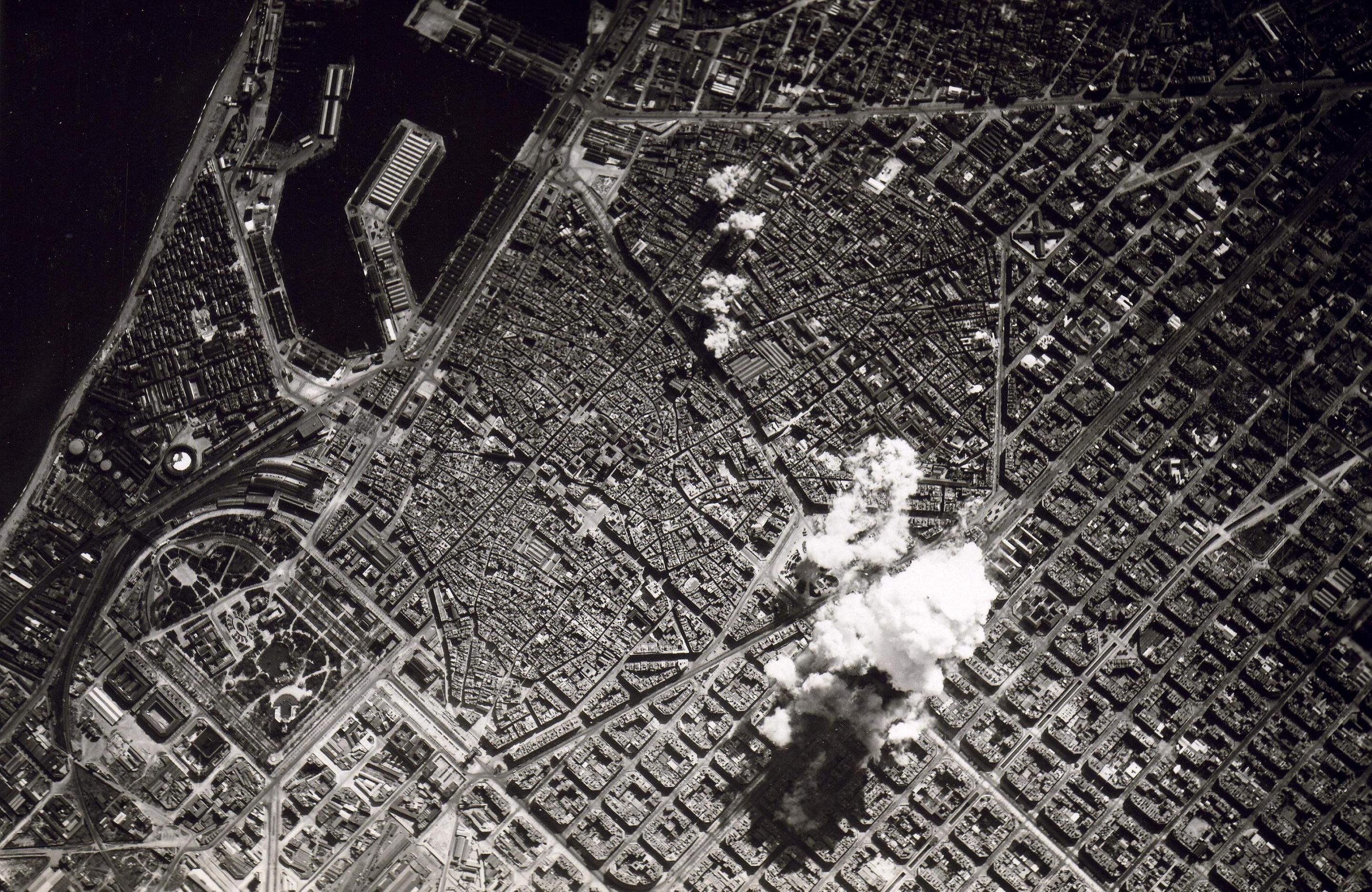
The bombing of Barcelona, 1938

In his earlier Modern Poetry he had also commented on the Ancient Greek poet's understanding of his role: “It was assumed that life was the source and subject of poetry. And life for the Greeks meant life within a community.” So

Why not admit that other people are always
Organic to the self, that a monologue
Is the death of language and that a single lion
Is less himself, or alive, than a dog and another dog? (section XVII)

Another hazard in modern writing that worried MacNeice was how a balance was to be achieved between the personal view and the tendency towards propaganda in the highly politicised decade of the 1930s. This tension is particularly evident in his decision to visit the besieged Catalan city of Barcelona at the close of 1938 so as to provide his poem with an appropriate finale. The upshot of the visit was the ridiculous incident described in his fragmentary biography, where an encounter with suspicious officials on leaving encapsulates the writer's dilemma:

The officials were puzzled by a little notebook full of illegible English verses in pencil. "What is this?" they said. "Poesia", I said. They handed it around to each other frowning. Then Scarpello [an American seaman] appeared. "What is that?" he said. "Just a few verses I wrote," I said, feeling foolishly out of place. Scarpello jerked his thumb at me. "Propagandista!" he said to the officials. They handed back the notebook and I flew over the Pyrenees.

For some contemporaries as well as for later critics, however, the poet's juggling act, his documentary ambition, were not seen as strengths so much as symptoms of the poem's ultimate failure. “Technical facility is never a substitute for substance, and the poem’s honesty in mirroring MacNeice’s bafflement in the face of history leaves the poem empty at the center, brought to a conclusion only by the conventions of the calendar. Such critics would argue that MacNeice fails to demonstrate the kind of belief or system he himself thought necessary for great poetry” and substitutes for it only commentary on the process.

== Autumn Sequel ==
In the autumn of 1953, MacNeice began work on a further discursive autobiographical work as a commentary on the time. Its continuity of theme with Autumn Journal was announced in the title given the book when it was published by Faber at the end of the following year - Autumn Sequel: A Rhetorical Poem in XXVI Cantos. The poem was rhetorical in that it was designed to be read on BBC Radio before its publication. The naming of its divisions as cantos appealed to the example of Dante’s Divine Comedy - as had Ezra Pound's ongoing The Cantos. The fact was further underlined by MacNeice's choice of terza rima, the same form used by Dante, for his own long poem.

The Sequel came with a prefatory note explaining that this later poem, "though similarly hinged to the autumn of 1953 and so also by its nature occasional, is less so, I think, than its predecessor." It also mentions that a number of the characters named there are the pseudonyms of personal friends. 'Gwilym', for example, is Dylan Thomas, a line from one of whose poems is quoted at the end of Canto XVIII. Others mentioned in the poem, representative of the community of fellow writers and cultural workers conceived of as his audience, include 'Egdon' (W.H. Auden) and 'Gorman' (W.R. Rodgers). MacNeice admits also to "parody echoes of Yeats and William Empson" as well as allusions to older poets – notably to John Skelton’s Speak Parrot.

The Sequel came during a slack period in MacNeice’s poetic development and was judged to "lack either the historical or the poetic interest of the earlier poem". The battle for 'civilisation' foreseen in the Journal is now past and in the poet's eyes the victory has been elusive. Judged from the ideal Classical standpoint of Thucydides, to whom reference is often made in the poem, the progressive homogenization of culture and disempowerment of the individual in the post-war Welfare state is the new threat in Britain. But after initial disappointment that the sequel was not the equal of its predecessor, there is now a tendency to review the work as a valid continuation of the Dantean tradition. In "arguing for a philosophical and political relativism and agnosticism that contest hierarchy and authority", the Sequel updates that tradition and gives it fresh relevance in a more structured way than had the Journal.

== Bibliography ==
- C. D. Blanton, Epic Negation: The Dialectical Poetics of Late Modernism, OUP 2015, "MacNeice’s Dying Fall", p. 233ff
- Teresa Bruś, "A Collection of Selves: Louis MacNeice's Autumn Journal", Connotations Vol. 22.2 (2012/13), pp. 187–213
- Louis MacNeice, Collected Poems 1925–48, London 1949, pp. 121–175
- Mélanie White, "Aristotle’s concept of energeia in Autumn Journal by Louis MacNeice, poet, classics scholar and intellectual", Etudes Irlandaises 24.2 2009, pp. 55–69
