= Louis MacNeice =

Irish poet and playwright (1907–1963)

Louis MacNeice CBE
- MacNeice on the cover of Selected Poems, edited by Michael Longley (1988)
- Born: Frederick Louis MacNeice; 12 September 1907; Belfast, Ireland
- Died: 3 September 1963 (aged 55); London, England
- Resting place: Church of Ireland, Carrowdore
- Citizenship: Irish, British
- Education: Sherborne Preparatory School; Marlborough College; Merton College, Oxford
- Occupations: Irish poet and playwright
- Spouse(s): Hedli Anderson (m. 1942–1960), Mary Ezra (m. 1930–1936)
- Children: Daniel MacNeice, Brigid Corinna MacNeice

Frederick Louis MacNeice (12 September 1907 – 3 September 1963) was an Irish poet, playwright and producer for the BBC. Known for its exploration of introspection, empiricism, and belonging, his poetic work is now considered among the twentieth century's greatest. Despite being renowned as a member of the Auden Group, he was also an independently successful (albeit occasionally overlooked) poet with an influential body of work, which is replete with themes ranging from faith to mortality. His body of work was appreciated by the public during his lifetime, due in part to his relaxed but socially and emotionally aware style. Never as overtly or simplistically political as some of his contemporaries, he expressed a humane opposition to totalitarianism as well as an acute awareness of his roots.

MacNeice was awarded the CBE in the 1958 New Year Honours list.

== Life ==
=== Ireland, 1907–1917 ===
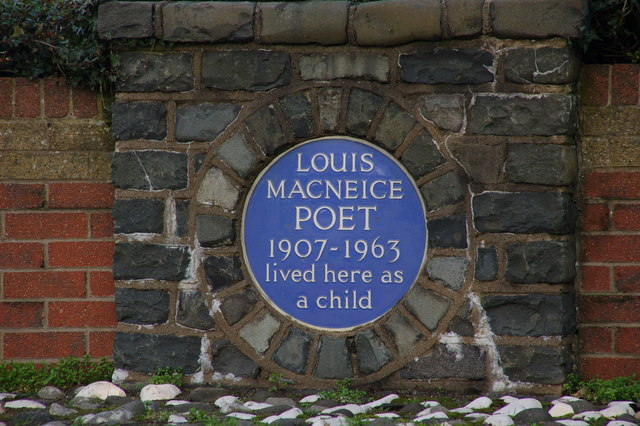
Plaque at site of MacNeice's childhood home in Carrickfergus

Louis MacNeice (known as Freddie until his teens, when he adopted his middle name) was born in Belfast, the youngest son of Rev. John Frederick and Elizabeth Margaret ("Lily") MacNeice. Both were originally from the west of Ireland. MacNeice's father, an Anglican clergyman, would go on to become a bishop in the Church of Ireland and his mother Elizabeth née Cleshan, from Ballymaconry, Connemara, County Galway, had been a schoolmistress. The family moved to Carrickfergus, County Antrim, soon after MacNeice's birth.

When MacNeice was six, his mother was admitted to a Dublin nursing home suffering from severe clinical depression and he did not see her again. She survived uterine cancer but died of tuberculosis in December 1914. MacNeice later described the cause of his mother's death as "obscure", and blamed his mother's cancer on his own difficult birth. His brother William, who had Down syndrome, had been sent to live in an institution in Scotland during his mother's terminal illness. In 1917, his father remarried to Georgina Greer and MacNeice's sister Elizabeth was sent to board at a preparatory school at Sherborne, England. MacNeice joined her at Sherborne Preparatory School later in the year.

=== School, 1917–1926 ===
MacNeice was generally happy at Sherborne, which gave an education concentrating on the Classics (Greek and Latin) and literature (including the memorising of poetry). He was an enthusiastic sportsman, something which continued when he moved to Marlborough College in 1921, having won a classical scholarship. Marlborough was a less happy place, with a hierarchical and sometimes cruel social structure, but MacNeice's interest in ancient literature and civilisation deepened and expanded to include Egyptian and Norse mythology. In 1922, he was invited to join Marlborough's secret 'Society of Amici' where he was a contemporary of John Betjeman and Anthony Blunt, forming a lifelong friendship with the latter. He also wrote poetry and essays for the school magazines. By the end of his time at the school, MacNeice was sharing a study with Blunt and also sharing his aesthetic tastes, though not his sexual ones; Blunt said MacNeice was "totally, irredeemably heterosexual". In November 1925, MacNeice was awarded a postmastership to Merton College, Oxford, and he left Marlborough in the summer of the following year. He left behind his birth name of Frederick, his accent and his father's faith, although he never lost a sense of his Irishness; (the BBC radio premiere of MacNeice's The Dark Tower in January 1946, was preceded by the poet's ten-minute introduction in his distinctive Ulster accent.)

=== Oxford, 1926–1930 ===
It was during his first year as a student at Oxford that MacNeice first met W. H. Auden, who had gained a reputation as the university's foremost poet during the preceding year. Stephen Spender and Cecil Day-Lewis were already part of Auden's circle, but MacNeice's closest Oxford friends were John Hilton, Christopher Holme and Graham Shepard, who had been with him at Marlborough. MacNeice threw himself into the aesthetic culture, publishing poetry in literary magazines The Cherwell and Sir Galahad, organising candle-lit readings of Shelley and Marlowe, and visiting Paris with Hilton. Auden would become a lifelong friend who inspired MacNeice to take up poetry seriously.

In 1928 he was introduced to the Classics don John Beazley and his stepdaughter Mary Ezra. A year later he thought to soften the news that he had been arrested for drunkenness by telegraphing his father to say he was engaged to be married to Mary. John MacNeice (by now Archdeacon of Connor, and a Bishop a few years later) was horrified to discover his son was engaged to a Jew, while Ezra's family demanded assurances that Louis's brother's Down's syndrome was not hereditary. Amidst this turmoil MacNeice published four poems in Oxford Poetry, 1929 and his first undergraduate collection Blind Fireworks (1929). Published by Gollancz, the volume was dedicated to "Giovanna" (Mary's full name was Giovanna Marie Thérèse Babette). In 1930 the couple were married at Oxford Register Office, neither set of parents attending the ceremony. He was awarded a first-class degree in literae humaniores, and had already gained an appointment as Assistant Lecturer in Classics at the University of Birmingham.

=== Birmingham, 1930–1936 ===
The newlyweds were found lodgings in Birmingham by E. R. Dodds (a professor of Greek and MacNeice's future literary executor) and his wife Bet. Bet was a lecturer in the Department of English. The MacNeices lived in a former coachman's cottage in the grounds of a house in Selly Park belonging to another professor, Philip Sargant Florence. Birmingham was a very different university (and city) from Oxford, MacNeice was not a natural lecturer, and he found it difficult to write poetry. He turned instead to a semi-autobiographical novel, Roundabout Way, which was published in 1932 under the name of Louis Malone as he feared a novel by an academic would not be favourably reviewed. He felt that married life was not helping his poetry: "To write poems expressing doubt or melancholy, an anarchist conception of freedom or nostalgia for the open spaces (and these were the things that I wanted to express), seemed disloyal to Mariette. Instead I was disloyal to myself, wrote a novel which purported to be an idyll of domestic felicity. As we predicted, the novel was not well received."

The local Classical Association included George Augustus Auden, Professor of Public Health and father of W. H. Auden, and by 1932 MacNeice and Auden's Oxford acquaintance had turned into a close friendship. Auden knew many Marxists, and Blunt had also become a communist by this time, but MacNeice, although sympathetic to the left, was always sceptical of easy answers and "the armchair reformist". The Strings are False (written at the time of the Molotov–Ribbentrop Pact) describes his wish for a change in society and even revolution, but also his intellectual opposition to Marxism and especially the communism embraced by many of his friends.

MacNeice started to write poetry again, and in January 1933 he and Auden led the first edition of Geoffrey Grigson's magazine New Verse. MacNeice also started sending poems to T. S. Eliot at around this time, and although Eliot did not feel that they merited Faber and Faber publishing a volume of poems, several were published in Eliot's journal The Criterion. On 15 May 1934, Louis and Mary's son Daniel John MacNeice was born. In September of that year, MacNeice travelled to Dublin with Dodds, who had republican sympathies, and met William Butler Yeats. Unsuccessful attempts at playwriting and another novel were followed in September 1935 by Poems, the first of his collections for Faber and Faber, who would remain his publishers. This helped establish MacNeice as one of the new poets of the 1930s.

In November, Mary left MacNeice and their infant son for a Russian-American graduate student called Charles Katzmann who had been staying with the family. MacNeice engaged a nurse to look after Dan, and his sister and stepmother also helped on occasion. In early 1936, Blunt and MacNeice visited Spain, shortly after the election of the Popular Front government. Auden and MacNeice travelled to Iceland in the summer of that year, which resulted in Letters from Iceland, a collection of poems, letters (some in verse) and essays. In October, MacNeice left Birmingham for a lecturing post in the Department of Greek at Bedford College for Women, part of the University of London.

=== London, 1936–1940 ===
MacNeice was featured in two high-profile collections of modernist poetry of 1936. The Faber Book of Modern Verse, edited by young writer and critic Michael Roberts, printing MacNeice's '"An Eclogue for Christmas", "Sunday Morning", "Perseus", "The Creditor" and "Snow" towards the end of the roughly chronological book. In the book, MacNeice is set in amongst others of the new Auden Group, presenting a version of modernism in which Eliot is the star. MacNeice and his group were also featured in Oxford Book of Modern Verse 1892–1935, edited by Yeats. This collection generally excluded American poets and was less well received critically, but instantaneously became a best-seller.

MacNeice moved into Geoffrey Grigson's former flat in Hampstead with Daniel and his nurse. His translation of Aeschylus's Agamemnon was published in late 1936, and produced by the Group Theatre. Shortly afterwards his divorce from Mary was finalised. They continued to write frequent affectionate letters to one another, although Mary married Katzmann shortly after the divorce.

MacNeice started an affair with Nancy Coldstream. Nancy was, like her husband Bill, a painter and a friend of Auden who had introduced the couple to MacNeice while they were in Birmingham. MacNeice and Nancy visited the Hebrides in 1937, which resulted in a book of prose and verse written by MacNeice with illustrations by Nancy, I Crossed the Minch. Nancy had painted a portrait of MacNeice.

August 1937 saw the appearance of Letters from Iceland (which had been finished by the two authors in MacNeice's London home the previous year), and towards the end of the year a play called Out of the Picture was published and produced by the Group Theatre. Music was written for the production by Benjamin Britten, as he had done previously for Agamemnon. In 1938, Faber and Faber published a second collection of poems, The Earth Compels, the Oxford University Press published Modern Poetry, and Nancy once again contributed illustrations to a book about London Zoo, called simply Zoo.

As the year – and his relationship with Nancy – drew to a close, he started work on Autumn Journal. By Christmas, Nancy was in love with Stephen Spender's brother Michael, whom she was later to marry, and at the end of the year MacNeice visited Barcelona shortly before the city fell to Franco. The poem was finished by February 1939, and published in May. It is widely viewed as MacNeice's masterpiece, recording his feelings as the Spanish Civil War raged and the United Kingdom headed towards war with Germany, as well as his personal concerns and reflections over the past decade.

During the Easter holiday that year, MacNeice made a brief lecture tour of various American universities, also meeting Mary and Charles Katzmann and giving a reading with Auden and Christopher Isherwood in New York attended by John Berryman, and at which Auden met Chester Kallman for the first time. MacNeice also met the writer Eleanor Clark in New York, and arranged to spend the next academic year on sabbatical so that he could be with her. A lectureship at Cornell University was organised, and in December 1939 MacNeice sailed for America, leaving his son in Ireland. Cornell proved a success but the relationship with Eleanor did not, and MacNeice was back in London by the end of 1940. Faber and Faber published Selected Poems in March 1940, which contained 20 poems drawn from Poems 1935, The Earth Compels and Autumn Journal. It went through six impressions by 1945 and is considered his best known work. MacNeice worked as a freelance journalist (he had resigned from his lecturing position at Bedford College while in America) and was awaiting the publication of Plant and Phantom, which was dedicated to Clark (the previous year, the Cuala Press had published The Last Ditch, a limited edition containing some poems that would appear in the new volume). In early 1941, MacNeice was employed by the BBC.

=== War and after, 1941–1963 ===
MacNeice's work for the BBC initially involved writing and producing radio programmes intended to build support for the US, and later Russia – cultural programmes emphasising links between the countries rather than outright propaganda. A critical work on W. B. Yeats (on which he had been working since the poet's death in 1939) was published early in 1941, as were Plant and Phantom and Poems 1925–1940 (an American anthology). At the end of the year, MacNeice started a relationship with Hedli Anderson and they were married in July 1942, three months after the death of his father. Brigid Corinna MacNeice (known by her second name like her parents, or as "Bimba") was born a year later. By the end of the war MacNeice had written well over sixty scripts for the BBC and a further collection of poems, Springboard. The radio play Christopher Columbus, produced in 1942 and later published as a book, featured music by William Walton, conducted by Sir Adrian Boult, and starred Laurence Olivier. 1943's He Had a Date (loosely based on the life and death of MacNeice's friend Graham Shepard but also semi-autobiographical) was also published, as was The Dark Tower (1946, again with music by Britten). Dylan Thomas acted in some of MacNeice's plays during this period, and the two poets, both heavy drinkers, also became social companions. MacNeice narrated (and wrote poems for) the 1945 film Painted Boats.

In 1947, the BBC sent MacNeice to report on Indian independence and partition, and he continued to produce plays for the corporation, including a six-part radio adaptation of Goethe's Faust in 1949. 1948's collection of poems, Holes in the Sky, met with a less favourable reception than previous books. In 1950 he was given eighteen months' leave to become Director of the British Institute in Athens, run by the British Council. Patrick Leigh Fermor had previously been deputy director of the institute, and he and his future wife, the Honourable Joan Elizabeth Rayner (née Eyres Monsell), became close friends of the MacNeices. Ten Burnt Offerings, poems written in Greece, were broadcast by the BBC in 1951 and published the following year. The family returned to England in August 1951, and Dan (who had been at an English boarding school) left for America in early 1952 to stay with his mother, to avoid national service. Dan would return to England in 1953, but went to live permanently with his mother after a legal battle with MacNeice.

In 1953, MacNeice wrote Autumn Sequel, a long autobiographical poem in terza rima, which critics compared unfavourably with Autumn Journal. The death of Dylan Thomas came partway through the writing of the poem, and MacNeice involved himself in memorials for the poet and attempts to raise money for his family. 1953 and 1954 brought lecture and performance tours of the USA (husband and wife would present an evening of song, monologue and poetry readings), and meetings with John Berryman (on the returning boat in 1953, and later in London) and Eleanor Clark (by now married to Robert Penn Warren). MacNeice travelled to Egypt in 1955 and Ghana in 1956 on lengthy assignments for the BBC. Another poorly received collection of poems, Visitations, was published in 1957, and the MacNeices bought a holiday home on the Isle of Wight from J. B. Priestley (an acquaintance since MacNeice's arrival in London twenty years earlier). However, the marriage was starting to become strained. MacNeice was drinking increasingly heavily, and having more or less serious affairs with other women. At this time MacNeice became increasingly independent of spirit, spending time with other writers, including Dominic Behan with whom he regularly drank to oblivion; the two men spent a particularly drunken night in the home of Cecil Woodham-Smith during a curious meeting in Ireland whilst Behan was working on assignment as a writer for Life magazine and MacNeice on assignment with the BBC. During the trip, which allegedly lasted some weeks, neither writer managed successfully to file his copy.

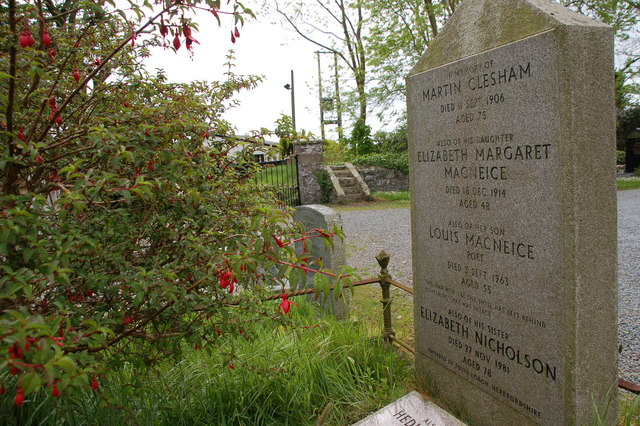
MacNeice was buried at Carrowdore with his mother

MacNeice was awarded the CBE in the 1958 New Year Honours list. A South African trip in 1959 was followed by the start of his final relationship, with the actress Mary Wimbush, who had performed in his plays since the forties. Hedli asked MacNeice to leave the family home in late 1960. In early 1961, Solstices was published, and in the middle of the year MacNeice became a half-time employee at the BBC, leaving him six months a year to work on his own projects. By this time he was "living on alcohol", and eating very little, but still writing (including a commissioned work on astrology, which he viewed as "hack-work"). In August 1963 he went caving in Yorkshire to gather sound effects for his final radio play, Persons from Porlock. Caught in a storm on the moors, he did not change out of his wet clothes until he was home in Hertfordshire. Bronchitis evolved into viral pneumonia, and he was admitted to hospital in London on 27 August, dying there on 3 September, aged 55.

His ashes were buried in Carrowdore churchyard in County Down, with his mother and maternal grandfather. His final book of poems, The Burning Perch, was published a few days after his funeral – Auden, who gave a reading at MacNeice's memorial service, described the poems of his last two years as "among his very best".

== Influence ==
MacNeice wrote in the introduction to his Autumn Journal, "Poetry in my opinion must be honest before anything else and I refuse to be 'objective' or clear-cut at the cost of honesty." He has inspired many poets since his death, particularly those from Northern Ireland such as Paul Muldoon and Michael Longley. There has been a movement to reclaim him as an Irish writer rather than a satellite of Auden. Longley has edited two selections of his work, and Muldoon gives more space to MacNeice than to any other author in his Faber Book of Contemporary Irish Poetry, which covers the period from the death of W. B. Yeats until 1986. Muldoon and Derek Mahon have both written elegies for MacNeice, Mahon's coming after a pilgrimage to the poet's grave in the company of Longley and Seamus Heaney in 1965. At the time of MacNeice's death, John Berryman described him as "one of my best friends", and wrote an elegy in Dream Song #267.

== Archive ==
Louis MacNeice's archive was established at the Harry Ransom Center at the University of Texas at Austin in 1964, a year after MacNeice's death. The collection, largely coming from MacNeice's sister Elizabeth Nicholson, includes manuscripts of poetic and dramatic works, a large number of books, correspondence, and books from MacNeice's library.

== Works ==
=== Poetry collections ===
- Blind Fireworks (1929, mainly considered by MacNeice to be juvenilia and excluded from the 1949 Collected Poems)
- Poems (1935)
- Letters from Iceland (1937, with W. H. Auden, poetry and prose)
- The Earth Compels (1938)
- Autumn Journal (1939)
- The Last Ditch (1940)
- Selected Poems (1940)
- Plant and Phantom (1941)
- Springboard (1944)
- Prayer Before Birth (1944)
- Holes in the Sky (1948)
- Collected Poems, 1925–1948 (1949)
- Ten Burnt Offerings (1952)
- Autumn Sequel (1954)
- Visitations (1957)
- Solstices (1961)
- The Burning Perch (1963)
- Star-gazer (1963)
- Selected Poems (1964, edited by W. H. Auden)
- Collected Poems (1966, edited by E. R. Dodds)
- Selected Poems (1988, edited by Michael Longley, redesigned and republished by Wake Forest University Press, 2009)
- Collected Poems (2007, edited by Peter McDonald)

=== Plays ===
- The Agamemnon of Aeschylus (1936, translation)
- Out of the Picture (1937)
- Christopher Columbus (1944, radio) & performed, Brighton Dome (2002)
- He Had a Date (1944, radio, not published separately)
- The Dark Tower and other radio scripts (1947)
- Goethe's Faust (1949, published 1951, a translation)
- Prisoner's Progress (radio play, broadcast on 27 April 1954, winner of the RAI Prize for Dramatic Works at the Prix Italia in Florence in 1954.)
- The Mad Islands [1962] and The Administrator [1961] (1964, radio)
- Persons from Porlock [1963] and other plays for radio (1969)
- One for the Grave: a modern morality play [1958] (1968)
- Selected Plays of Louis MacNeice, ed. Alan Heuser and Peter McDonald (1993)

MacNeice also wrote several plays which were never produced, and many for the BBC which were never published.

=== Books (fiction) ===
- Roundabout Way (1932, as "Louis Malone")
- The Sixpence That Rolled Away (1956, for children)

=== Books (non-fiction) ===
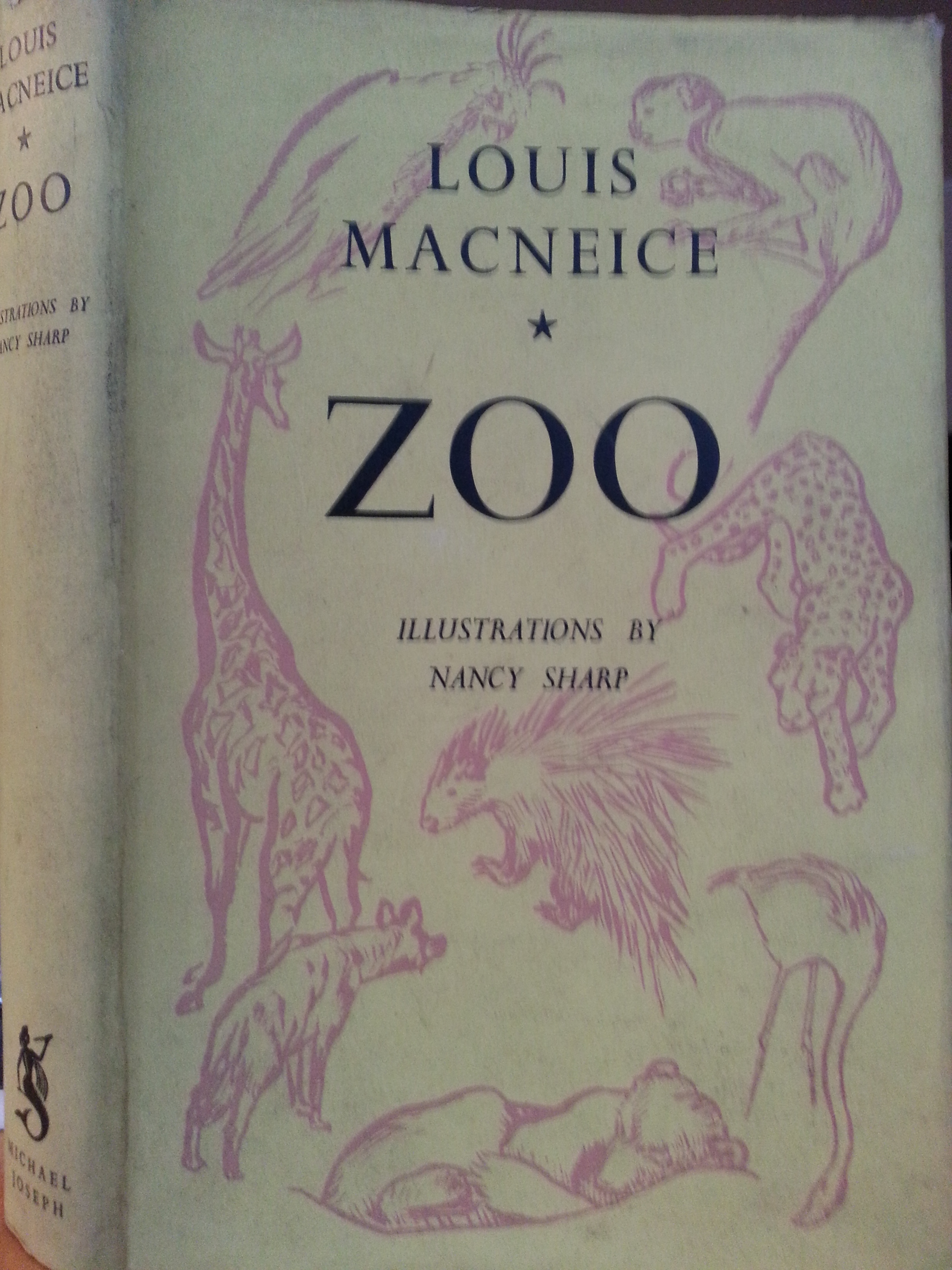
First edition dust jacket of Zoo, (1938), illustrations by Nancy Sharp

- I Crossed the Minch (1938, travel, prose and verse)
- Modern Poetry: A Personal Essay (1938, criticism)
- Zoo (1938)
- The Poetry of W. B. Yeats (1941)
- The Strings Are False (1941, published 1965, autobiography)
- Meet the US Army (1943)
- Astrology (1964)
- Varieties of Parable (1965, criticism)
- Selected Prose of Louis MacNeice, ed. Alan Heuser (1990)

== Notes ==
- Louis MacNeice, Collected Poems, ed. by Peter McDonald, Faber and Faber, 2007.
- Louis MacNeice: Selected Poems, Longley, Michael (ed. and Introduction), Faber and Faber. ISBN 0-571-15270-8; published in the United States by Wake Forest University Press.
- Louis MacNeice, Letters of Louis MacNeice, ed. by Jonathan Allison, Faber and Faber, 2010. ISBN 978-0571-22441-8
- Louis MacNeice, The Strings are False (autobiography), Faber and Faber, 1965. ISBN 0-571-11832-1
- Jon Stallworthy Louis MacNeice Faber and Faber, 1995. ISBN 0-571-17687-9
