= Arrol Gantry =

Shipyard gantry in Belfast

Coordinates: 54.6096°N 5.9090°W

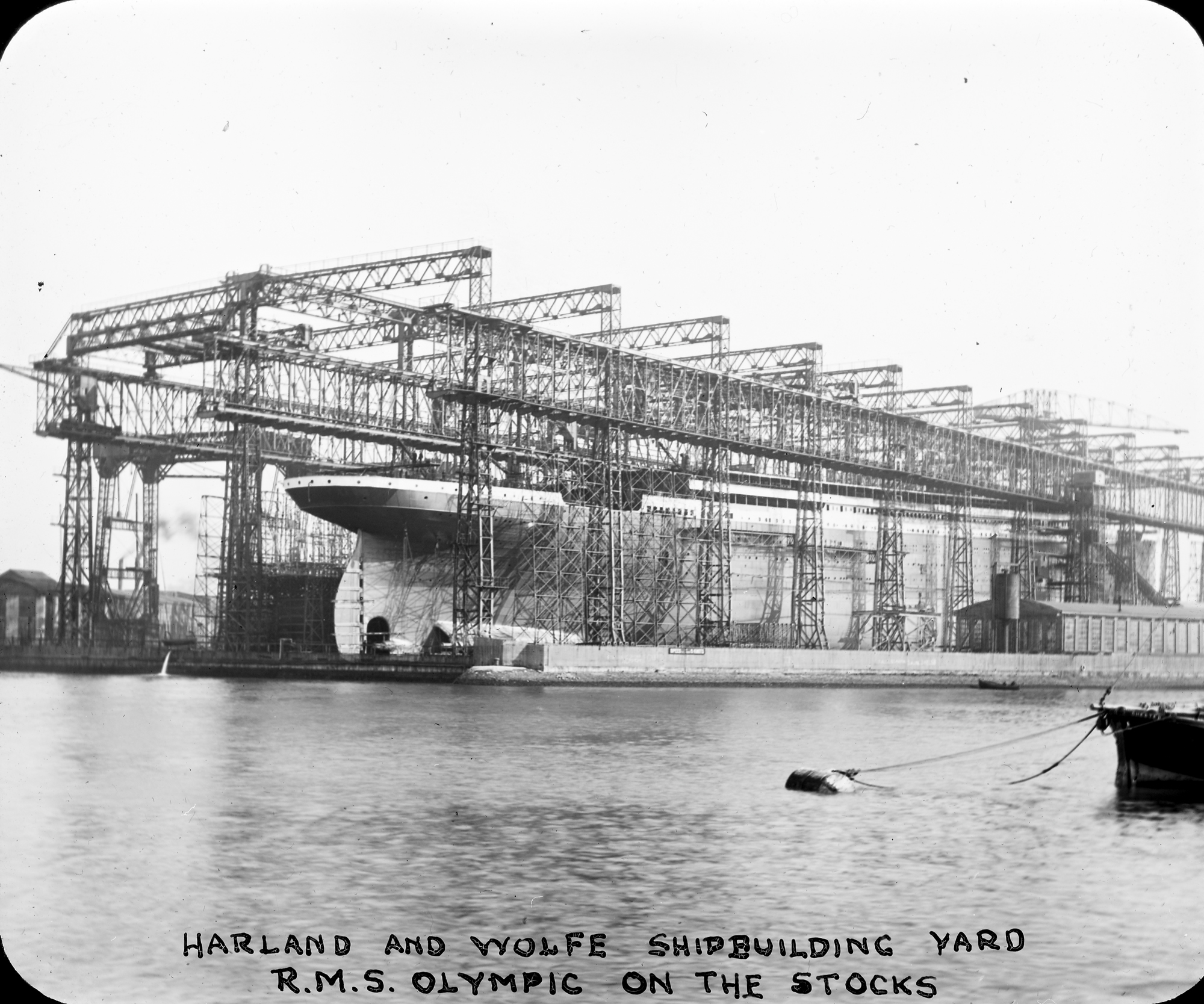
RMS Titanic, (Note: The photograph caption is incorrect) in 1911, after Olympic's launch

The Arrol Gantry was a large steel structure built by Sir William Arrol & Co. at the Harland and Wolff shipyard in Belfast, Ireland. It was built to act as overhead cranes for the building of the three Olympic-class liners.

== Beardmore's gantry at Dalmuir ==
From 1900 to 1906, Arrol had constructed a shipyard for William Beardmore and Company at Dalmuir on the Clyde. This included a large gantry structure over the building berth. In 1906 it was used for the construction of the pre-dreadnought battleship HMS Agamemnon, then the largest battleship launched on the Clyde.

The Beardmore gantry was 750 ft (230 m) long, 135 ft (41 m) wide and 150 ft (46 m) high, spanning a single building berth. The structure was of two long steel truss girders, supported on eleven pairs of steel truss towers, braced by cross trusses above. Nine electric cranes were provided, with four jib cranes along each side girder, each having a 5-ton capacity and 30 foot jib. These were travelling cranes and could be moved along the girder, or grouped together to share a heavier lift. They were intended to place the main hull plates into position, with a dedicated gang for each crane, forming the plates and riveting them into place. A central 15 ton travelling gantry crane was also provided, for lifting machinery along the centreline of the hull.

The Belfast gantry would be very similar to this first gantry, although larger at 840 ft (260 m) long and spanning two building berths. The central girder between the berths allowed the addition of a larger cantilever crane.

The Beardmore gantry had used tapered towers, with size and strength proportional to the load upon them. The base of each was spread into a triangular arch, giving a more stable base and also allowing a railway line to be laid through the towers, bringing construction materials. For the Belfast gantry, the towers were more parallel, with straight inner faces. This allowed temporary working platforms to be attached and relocated upwards as a hull was constructed, giving an additional working space and easy access to the outside of the hull, even with heavy equipment. The access within the gantry was also improved, with long sloping walkways and electric lifts, rather than the previous slow and hazardous use of ladders.

== Construction ==
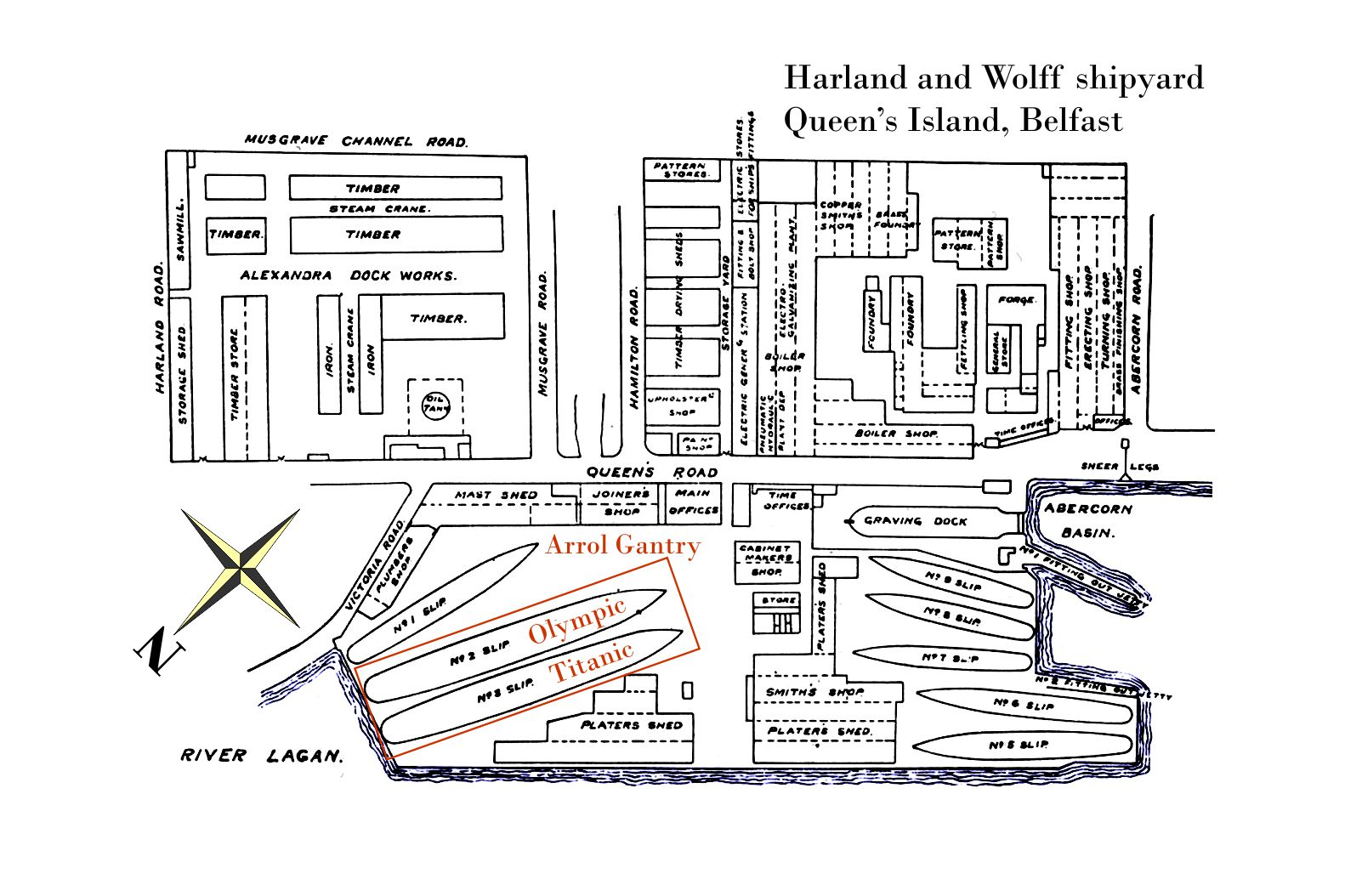
Plan of the Queen's Island shipyard, showing the Olympic slipways and the position of the Gantry

The Belfast gantry was commissioned by the White Star Line and Harland and Wolff and built by Sir William Arrol & Co. in 1908. It was 840 feet (260 m) feet long, 270 feet (82 m) feet wide and 228 feet (69 m) feet high. It was an essential part of the infrastructure needed for the construction of the RMS Olympic and RMS Titanic and remained in use until it was demolished in the late 1960s to create space for storage and car parking.

Before the Gantry, the northern end of the Queen's Island shipyard had four building slips, each with gantry cranes above them. The cranes formed three crosswise gantries over each slip, with jib cranes working from each upright. To make space for the two new slips, three of the old slips were given up. No 1 slip remained and continued in use, with its original gantries, and was used for building liners such as the SS Belgenland. The two new slips were numbered 2 & 3. There were nine slips at Queen's Island before this, eight afterwards but the other remained numbered as 5...9 and there was no longer a No 4 slip.

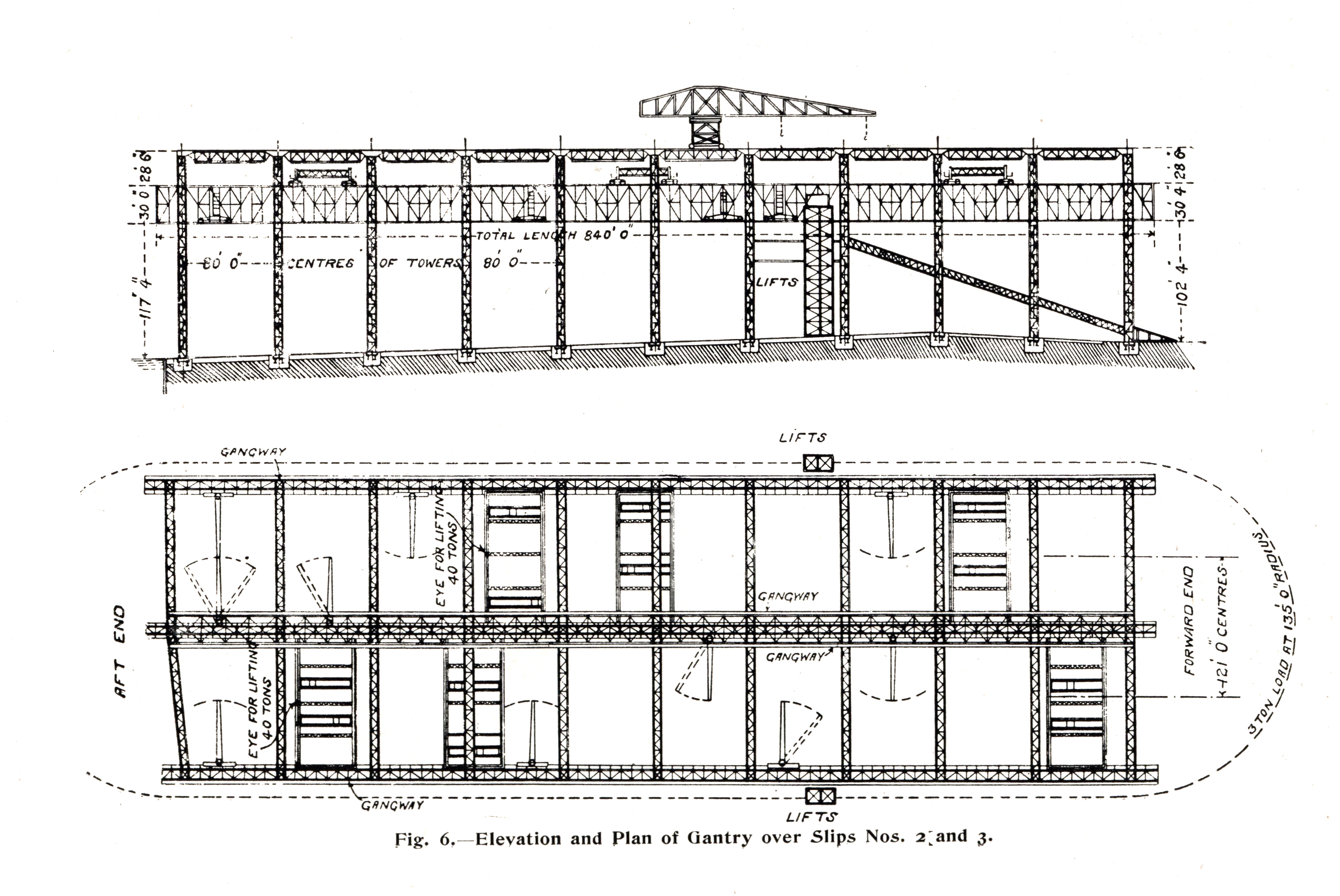
Lengthwise elevation of the Gantry

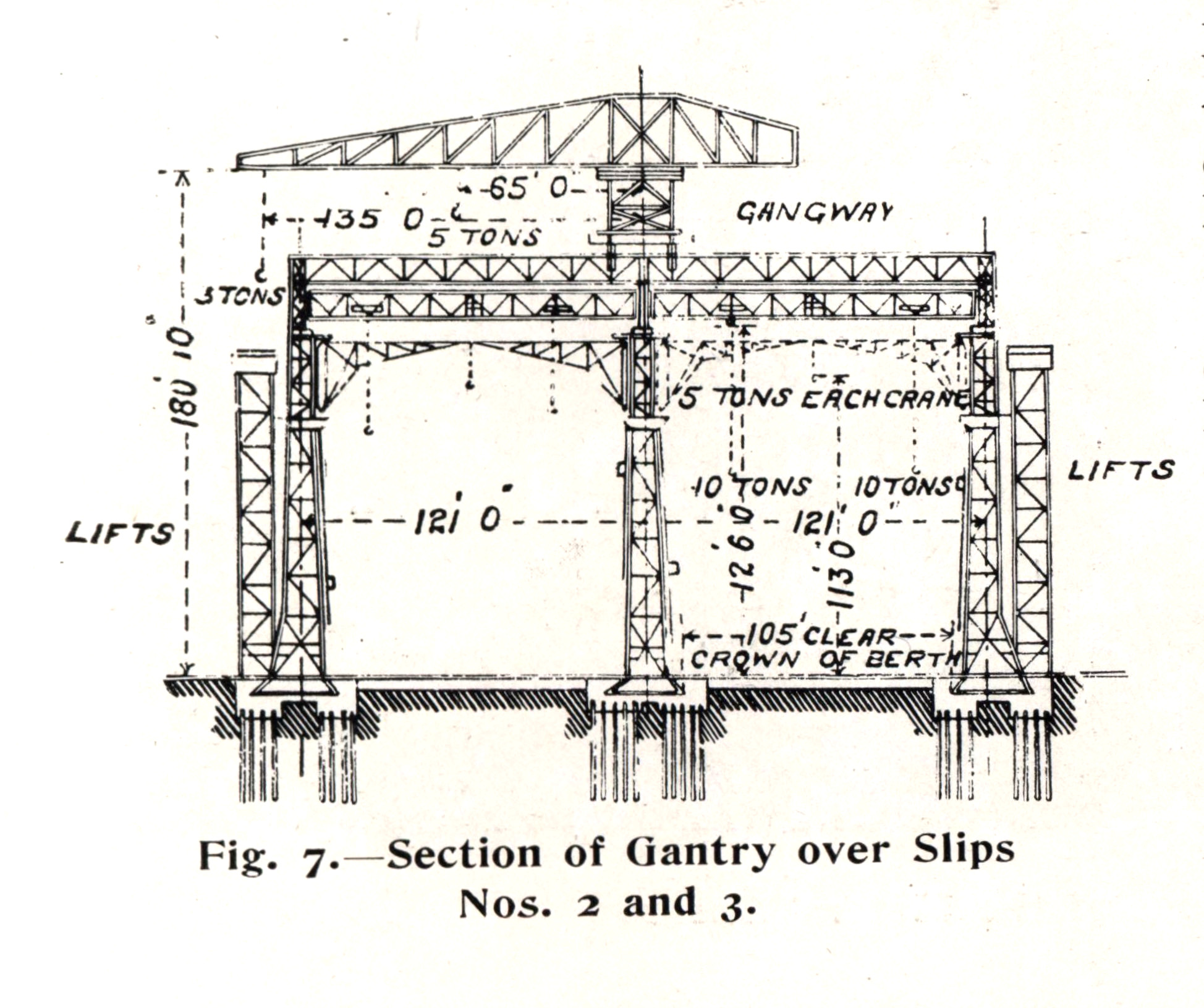
Crosswise section of the Gantry

The Gantry was built on three rows, 120 feet (37 m) apart, of eleven steel truss towers with three large truss girders between them, and lighter crosswise Warren trusses above this. The large girders provided runways for a pair of 10-ton overhead cranes above each way and lighter 5-ton jib cranes from the sides. Along the centre line ran a light Titan crane, with a reach of 135 feet and able to carry a 3-ton load at full radius, and 5 tons closer in. The cranes were electrically powered and built by Stothert & Pitt of Bath. Access to the high girders was provided by three long ramps and also electric lifts for the shipyard workers. As Harland and Wolff were primarily a commercial yard, (Note: This changed later, with the acquisition of H&W's Clydeside yards.) there was no need for the huge Titan cranes being built at this time for the naval shipyards of the Clyde, where heavy lifts of armour plate, or even entire turrets, were needed. (Note: This changed under the pressures of WWI, and several monitors and the 'large, light cruiser' HMS Glorious would later be built here.)

== Olympic-class liners ==
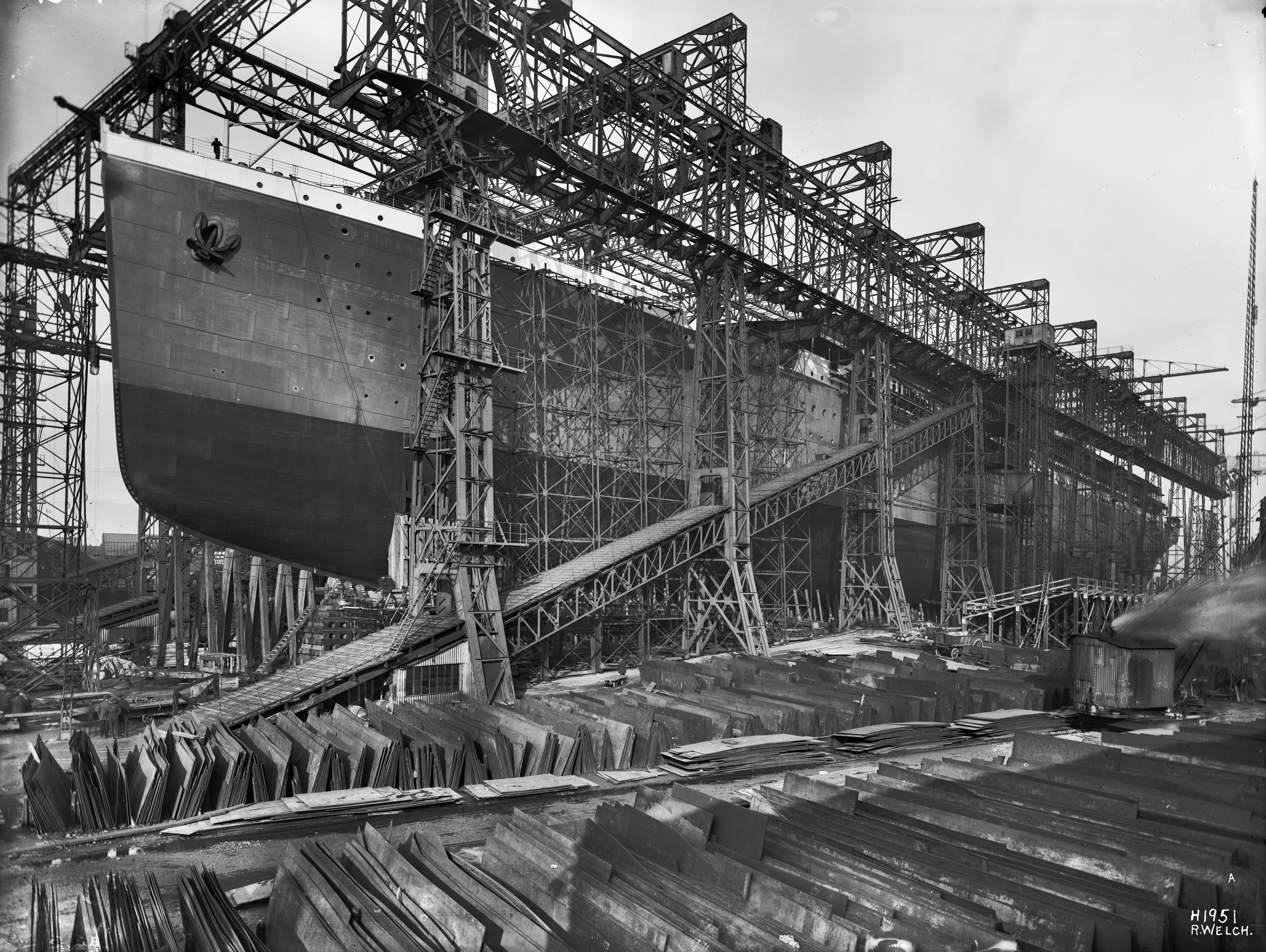
The Arroll Gantry towering above RMS Britannic, circa 1914

Olympic and Titanic were built together, with Olympic in the No 2 slipway. (Note: No 3 way, used for Titanic, was the eastern building way, nearest to the Lagan. Looking forwards from on board the ships, this was the right-hand / starboard side way.) (Note: As usual, the ships were launched stern-first) Olympic was launched first, in October 1910, with Titanic seven months later. To provide better photographs against the steelwork of the gantry, Olympic's hull was painted white during building, then repainted after launch. Titanic was painted in White Star's black hull livery from the outset. Britannic was then constructed on the Olympic's slipway.

== World War I ==
At the outbreak of World War I, Harland and Wolff were still engaged in building passenger liners and the Belgian Red Star Line's (Note: Although Red Star was a Belgian shipping line with their home port in Antwerp, both Red Star and White Star were owned by J. P. Morgan's IMM.) 27,000 ton SS Belgenland was almost completed on the adjacent No 1 way. SS Statendam had been launched from the No 2 way in July, a fortnight before the outbreak of war. A further liner, yard number 470, had been laid down there, but work had hardly started. (Note: The identity of this ship is often confused, and it is unclear if work on it was abandoned or merely suspended and resumed later. It was laid down as the SS Germanic of 19,000 tons, renamed at the outbreak of war to the Homeric and then work on it was halted. Some sources confuse it with the Homeric of 35,000 tons. The later Homeric was a German-built liner, the Columbus, which was taken as war reparations and renamed in 1920. Work on the Laurentic recommenced post-war, although she was not launched until 1927, by which time her appearance was looking distinctly antiquated.)

=== 14 inch monitors ===
When the Royal Navy wished to build the 14 inch monitors as coastal bombardment ships, these building ways were the most immediately available. The monitors were fairly small, of around 6,000 tons and quite short, but they also had protective anti-torpedo bulges which gave them an extremely broad beam of 90 feet (27 m). This would require equally wide building slips, which the Olympic slips could provide. The monitors were so short that the first two of them, Admiral Farragut and General Grant, could be built simultaneously on the same slipway. (Note: The monitors were initially named after US generals, in honour of the US source for their guns. However the neutral US was politically embarrassed by this and so they were renamed to a simple M1...M4 after launch, then later to Abercrombie and Havelock) Farragut was launched on 15 April 1915, with Grant following on 29 April. The limited lifting capacity of the gantry's cranes required the 4-inch armour plate to be installed in particularly small pieces, compared to in a warship building yard. To install their US-supplied turrets, the hulls were taken to the COW yard on the Clyde.

=== 12 inch monitors ===
A second group of monitors was also built. These were the 12 inch monitors and used guns taken from Majestic-class pre-dreadnought battleships. Although their 12-inch guns were now quite old, they had been sufficiently advanced over other guns at the time that they were still worth re-using. They had been the first British battleship main guns to use wire-wound construction and also the first to fire cordite propelling charges. As originally mounted, their elevation of 13½° only permitted a range of 13,700 yd (12,500 m), which would leave the monitors within range of German coastal defences; with this increased to 30°, a range of 21,000 yd (19,000 m) was expected. Eight of these monitors were built, five by Harland and Wolff and four of them on slips 1 and 3 of the Queen's Island yard. Like the 14 inch monitors, these monitors had prominent anti-torpedo bulges to their hulls and required a wide building slip, but were short enough that two could be built simultaneously on the large liner slips.

=== Glorious ===
Glorious was laid down as a 'large, light cruiser' on 1 May 1915 and launched almost a year later on 20 April 1916.

A class of small 6 inch gun-armed monitors was also designed, to use the secondary armament removed from the Queen Elizabeth battleships. (Note: The aft casemates of this armament were found to be too close to the waterline, and too wet to be worked at sea.) As the 14-inch monitors were now almost complete, it was hoped to build this whole class of five on a single large slipway. However the number 2 slipway was needed immediately for Glorious. Slipway 5, at the southern end of Queen's Island, was used instead to build three of them, working around the keel of the postponed SS Narkunda, and the other two at the Workman, Clark yard across the water.

=== Terror ===
A second batch of 15 inch-armed monitors were built, with a more developed design than the earlier Marshals. Both were built by Harland and Wolff, Erebus at the Govan yard and Terror on the third slip at Queen's Island. The Marshal monitors had been so unsuccessful, largely owing to their slow speed and their unreliable diesel engines, particularly for Marshal Ney, that it was decided to remove their turrets for re-use on the new high-speed monitors. Ney's turret was removed at Elswick and the mount converted for greater elevation, then shipped to Belfast for installation by Harland and Wolff's floating crane.

Both of these monitors had a successful WWI career and served into WWII.

=== Berth plan ===
Building Berth	1909	1910	1911	1912	1913	1914	1915		1916
1		Nomadic (422)			Belgenland (391)		Earl of Peterborough (480)		Arundel Castle (455)
1		Nomadic (422)			Belgenland (391)		Sir Thomas Picton (481)		Arundel Castle (455)
2	Olympic (400)	Arlanza (415)		Britannic (433)		Admiral Farragut / Abercrombie (472)		Glorious (482)	Vindictive (500)
2	Olympic (400)	Arlanza (415)		Britannic (433)		General Grant / Havelock (473)		Glorious (482)	Vindictive (500)
3		Titanic (401)			Statendam (436)	Laurentic (470)	Lord Clive (478)	Terror (493)	
3		Titanic (401)			Statendam (436)	Laurentic (470)	General Craufurd (479)	Terror (493)	

== Disuse ==
The Gantry was in use into the 1960s, but the shipyard was then reorganised to provide a larger building space. Work on large ships then took place in a large dry dock at the end of the Musgrave channel on the south-eastern side of Queen's Island, served by a pair of Goliath cranes, Samson and Goliath. The Gantry was demolished in the late 1960s to create space for storage and car parking.

A gallery at Titanic Belfast is dominated by a steel scaffold which stands 20 metres (66 ft) high and alludes to the Arrol Gantry: however, the original gantry was nearly four times the height of the gallery's representation.

== In popular culture ==
The gantry dominated the skyline of Belfast and became an important local landmark, as Samson and Goliath would do again fifty years later. The poet Louis MacNeice's autobiographical poem Carrickfergus describes his birthplace:

"I was born in Belfast between the mountain and the gantries
To the hooting of lost sirens and the clang of trams:"

This is somewhat anachronistic, as MacNeice was born just before the construction of the gantry and his family had moved to nearby Carrickfergus before Olympic's launch.
