= HMS Roberts (1915) =

1915 Abercrombie-class monitor

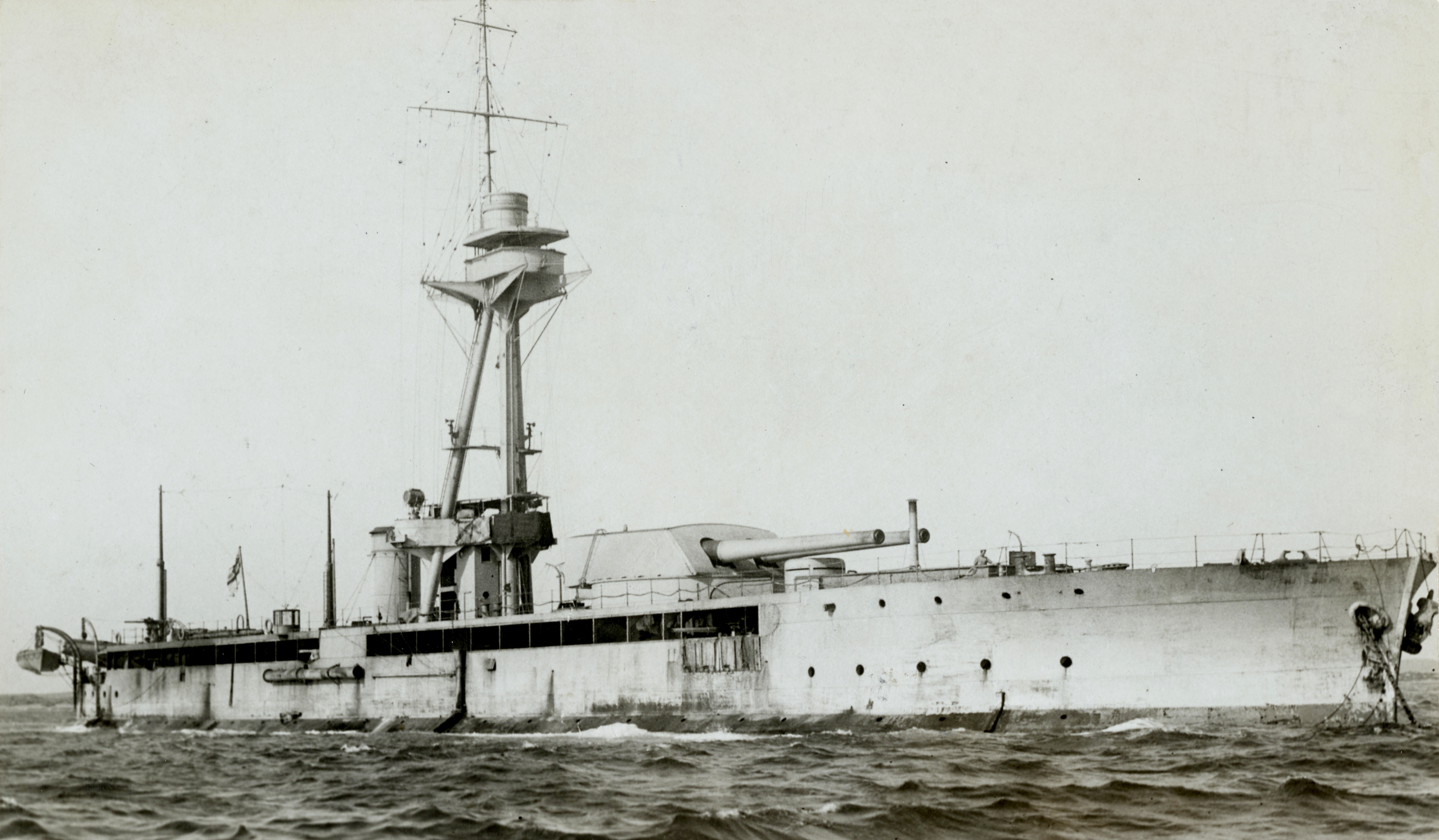
- HMS Roberts c.1918

History

United Kingdom
- Namesake: Lord Roberts
- Operator: Royal Navy
- Ordered: 21 November 1914
- Builder: Swan Hunter, Wallsend
- Laid down: 17 December 1914
- Launched: 15 April 1915
- Commissioned: 21 May 1915
- Out of service: 26 May 1919
- Honours and awards: Dardanelles 1915
- Fate: Sold September 1936

General characteristics
- Class & type: Abercrombie-class monitor
- Displacement: 6,150 long tons (6,250 t)
- Length: 334.5 ft (102.0 m) oa; 320 ft (98 m) pp
- Beam: 90 ft (27 m)
- Draught: 10.2 ft (3.1 m)
- Propulsion: 2 shaft triple expansion reciprocating steam
- Speed: 6 knots (11 km/h; 6.9 mph)
- Range: 1,340 nmi (2,480 km; 1,540 mi) at 6 knots
- Complement: 198
- Armament: (as built): 2 × 14-inch (356 mm)/45 caliber guns; 2 × 12-pounder (3-inch) guns; 1 × 3-pounder anti-aircraft gun; 1 × 2-pounder AA gun; (1918): 2 × 14-inch (356 mm)/45 caliber guns; 1 × BL 6-inch (152 mm) Mk XII guns; 2 × 12-pounder AA guns; 1 × 3-in AA gun; 1 × 3-pounder AA gun; 2 × 2-pounder AA gun
- Armour: Belt 4 in (100 mm); Bulkheads 4 in; Barbette 8 in (200 mm); Turret 10 in (250 mm); Deck 2 in (51 mm) - 1 in (25 mm)
- Aviation facilities: Fitted to carry a seaplane

HMS Roberts was an Abercrombie-class monitor of the Royal Navy that served in the First World War.

== Background ==
On 3 November 1914, Charles M. Schwab of Bethlehem Steel offered Winston Churchill, then First Lord of the Admiralty, the use of four 14 in (356 mm)/45cal BL MK II twin gun turrets, originally destined for the Greek ship Salamis. These turrets could not be delivered to the German builders, due to the British naval blockade. The Royal Navy immediately created a class of monitors, designed for shore bombardment, to use the turrets.

Roberts was laid down at the Swan Hunter, Ltd shipyard at Wallsend on 17 December 1914. The ship was named Stonewall Jackson in honour of the CSA General Thomas Jonathan "Stonewall" Jackson, however as the United States was still neutral, the ship was hurriedly renamed HMS M4 on 31 May 1915. She was then named HMS Earl Roberts on 19 June 1915 and again renamed HMS Roberts on 22 June 1915

== Service history ==
Roberts sailed for the Dardanelles campaign in June 1915. She remained in the Eastern Mediterranean until returning to England in February 1916. She served as a guard ship at Yarmouth until the end of the War. She decommissioned in May 1919, and was initially sold for breaking up in May 1921, but was retained by the Admiralty for trials.

Around 1925 she was considered for conversion to a mobile airship base with a mooring mast and fueling capabilities, but nothing came of this proposal. In the 1930s, she was used for testing underwater protection for new construction warships. She was finally sold in September 1936 to the Ward shipyard at Preston for breaking up.

== In command ==
- Captain H.N. Garnett, (May 1915–?)
- Commander W.A. Thompson, (?)
- Commander Kenneth Dewar, (August 1916 – 1917)
- Commander B.M. Eyres-Monsell, (September 1918–?)
- Lieutenant-Commander E.J.J. Southby, (January 1919 – May 1919)
