= Minorsky =

The family name Minorsky may refer to:

- Nicolas Minorsky (1885 – 1970), a Russian American control theory mathematician and applied scientist.
- Vladimir Minorsky (1877 – 1966), a Russian Orientalist who studied Kurdish and Persian history, geography, literature and culture.
