= Lionel Grant Tufnell =

Royal Navy Admiral (1857–1930)

Admiral Lionel Grant Tufnell CMG
- Born: 27 October 1857; Northfleet, Kent, England
- Died: 11 August 1930 (aged 72)
- Military career
- Allegiance: United Kingdom
- Branch: Royal Navy
- Service years: 1870–1913
- Rank: Admiral
- Commands: British naval mission to Greece (1911–13); Royal Naval Barracks, Devonport (1910–11); Royal Naval Engineering College (1908–10); HMS Irresistible (1906–07); HMS Astraea (1904–06); HMS Boscawen (1902–04); HMS Cruizer (1899–01)
- Awards: Companion of the Order of St Michael and St George

Admiral Lionel Grant Tufnell, CMG (27 October 1857 – 11 August 1930) was an officer of the Royal Navy.

In 1911 he was chosen to head the British naval mission to Greece, where he was given the rank of vice admiral in the Royal Hellenic Navy and enjoyed sweeping powers over the ships and shore establishments of the Greek navy. The mission's work was interrupted with the outbreak of the First Balkan War in October 1912, but its efforts, particularly in matters of training and gunnery practice, were important in modernising the Greek navy and preparing it for its successful campaigns in the Balkan Wars. Tufnell remained in Greece as an advisor to the Ministry of Naval Affairs until late 1913, when he returned to England. He was replaced by another British naval mission, which arrived in September 1913 and was headed by Rear Admiral Mark Kerr.

He later became a full admiral on the retired list.

== See also ==
- Greek battleship Salamis

== Sources ==
- Fotakis, Zisis (2005). Greek Naval Strategy and Policy, 1910–1919. London: Routledge. ISBN 978-0-415-35014-3.
