= HMS Havelock (1915) =

British Abercrombie-class monitor

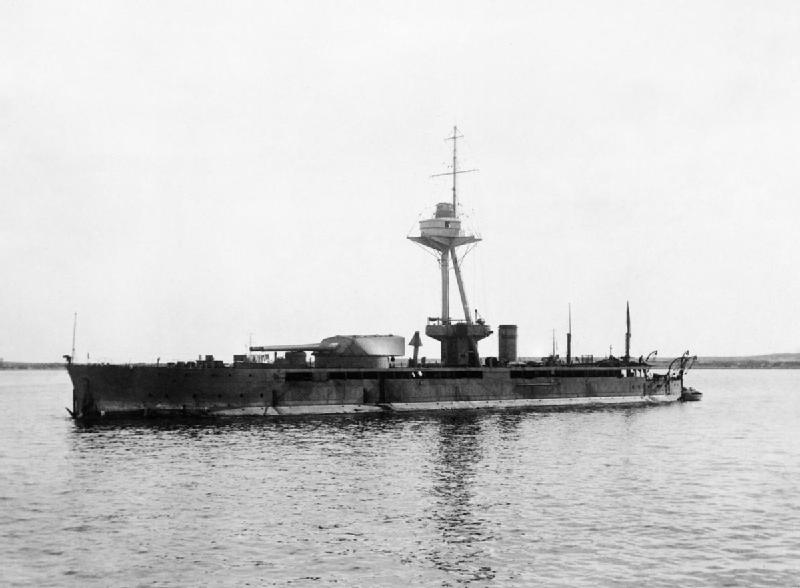

History

United Kingdom
- Name: Havelock
- Operator: Royal Navy
- Builder: Harland & Wolff, Belfast
- Yard number: 473
- Laid down: 12 December 1914
- Launched: 29 April 1915
- Completed: 29 May 1915
- Commissioned: May 1915
- Honours and awards: Dardanelles 1915
- Fate: Sold 25 June 1927

General characteristics
- Class & type: Abercrombie-class monitor
- Displacement: 6,150 long tons (6,250 t)
- Length: 334.5 ft (102.0 m) oa; 320 ft (98 m) pp
- Beam: 90 ft (27 m)
- Draught: 10.2 ft (3.1 m)
- Propulsion: Two shaft quadruple expansion reciprocating steam
- Speed: 6 knots (11 km/h; 6.9 mph)
- Complement: 198
- Armament: (as built): 2 × 14-inch (356 mm)/45 caliber guns; 2 × 12-pounder (3-inch) guns; 1 × 3-pounder anti-aircraft gun; 1 × 2-pounder AA gun; (1918): 2 × 14-inch (356 mm)/45 caliber guns; 2 × 12-pounder (3-inch) AA guns
- Armour: Belt: 4 in (100 mm); Bulkheads: 4 in; Barbette: 8 in (200 mm); Turret: 10 in (250 mm); Deck: 2–1 in (51–25 mm)
- Aviation facilities: Fitted to carry a seaplane

HMS Havelock was an Abercrombie-class monitor of the Royal Navy that saw service in the First World War.

== Background ==
On 3 November 1914, Charles M. Schwab of Bethlehem Steel offered Winston Churchill, then First Lord of the Admiralty, the use of four 14 in (356 mm)/45cal BL MK II twin gun turrets, originally destined for the Greek ship Salamis. These turrets could not be delivered to the German builders, due to the British naval blockade. The Royal Navy immediately designed a class of monitors, designed for shore bombardment, to use the turrets.

HMS Havelock was laid down at the Harland & Wolff Ltd shipyard at Belfast on 12 December 1914. The ship was named General Grant in honour of the United States General Ulysses S Grant, however as the United States was still neutral, the ship was hurriedly renamed HMS M2 on 31 May 1915. She was then named HMS Havelock on 20 June 1915.

== Service history ==
HMS Havelock sailed for the Dardanelles campaign in June 1915. She remained in the Eastern Mediterranean until returning to England in January 1916. She then served as a guard ship at Lowestoft. She was decommissioned in May 1919, and disarmed in June 1920. Sold for breaking up in May 1921, she was retained in reserve until resold on 25 June 1927 to the Ward shipyard at Preston for breaking up.
