= HMS Abercrombie (1915) =

Abercrombie-class warship

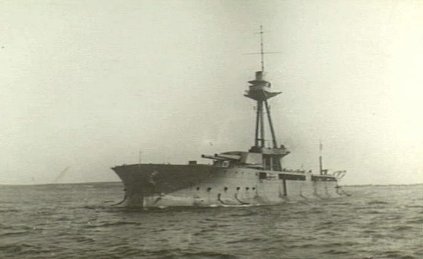
- Abercrombie off Gallipoli in July 1915

History

United Kingdom
- Name: Abercrombie
- Operator: Royal Navy
- Builder: Harland & Wolff, Belfast
- Yard number: 472
- Laid down: 12 December 1914
- Launched: 15 April 1915
- Completed: 29 May 1915
- Commissioned: 1 May 1915
- Decommissioned: May 1919
- Honours and awards: Dardanelles 1915
- Fate: Sold 25 June 1927 and scrapped

General characteristics
- Class & type: Abercrombie-class monitor
- Displacement: 6,150 long tons (6,250 t)
- Length: 334.5 ft (102.0 m) oa; 320 ft (98 m) pp
- Beam: 90 ft (27 m)
- Draught: 10.2 ft (3.1 m)
- Propulsion: 2 shaft quadruple expansion reciprocating steam
- Speed: 6 knots (11 km/h; 6.9 mph)
- Complement: 198
- Armament: (as built) : 2 × 14-inch (356 mm)/45 caliber guns; 2 × 12-pounder (3-inch) guns; 1 × 3-pounder anti-aircraft gun; 1 × 2-pounder AA gun; (1918) : 2 × 14-inch (356 mm)/45 caliber guns; 1 × BL 6-inch (152 mm) Mk XII guns; 2 × 12-pounder AA guns; 1 × 3-in AA gun; 1 × 3-pounder AA gun; 1 × 2-pounder AA gun
- Armour: Belt: 4 in (102 mm); Bulkheads: 4 in (102 mm); Barbette: 8 in (203 mm); Turret: 10 in (254 mm); Deck: 2–1 in (51–25 mm)
- Aviation facilities: Fitted to carry a seaplane

HMS Abercrombie was a First World War Royal Navy Abercrombie-class monitor.

== Background and construction ==
On 3 November 1914, Charles M. Schwab of Bethlehem Steel offered Winston Churchill, then First Lord of the Admiralty, the use of four 14 in (356 mm)/45cal BL MK II twin gun turrets, originally destined for the Greek battleship Salamis. These turrets could not be delivered to the German builders, due to the British naval blockade. The Royal Navy immediately designed a class of monitors, designed for shore bombardment, to use the turrets.

The ship was initially named Admiral Farragut in honour of the United States Admiral David Farragut, and reflecting the origin of the guns. She was laid down at the Harland & Wolff shipyard in Belfast on 12 December 1914. Farragut and General Grant were built together on the No 2 building berth, which had been constructed to build RMS Olympic. The No 2 & 3 berths were beneath the Arrol Gantry, a large truss girder construction supporting modern electric cranes above the building slip. The monitors were extremely broad over their torpedo bulges, and needed a building berth of this size, but were so short that both could fit into one. Faragut was launched first, on 15 April 1915. Both monitors were built to a high level of completion before launching, with nearly all machinery in place except for the turret. As this required a heavyweight lift, beyond the capacity of a civilian yard, the turrets for both monitors were fitted at the COW yard on the Clyde. As the United States was still neutral, the ship was hurriedly renamed HMS M1 on 31 May 1915. She was then named HMS General Abercrombie on 19 June 1915 and renamed HMS Abercrombie on 21 June 1915.

== Service history ==
Abercrombie sailed for the Dardanelles campaign on 24 June 1915, and provided fire support during the Battle of Gallipoli. She remained in the Eastern Mediterranean and the Aegean, until returning to England in February 1919. She was decommissioned in May 1919 and was disarmed in June 1920. Sold for breaking up in May 1921, she was retained in reserve until resold on 25 June 1927 to the Thos. W. Ward shipyard at Inverkeithing for scrapping.
