= 14-inch/45-caliber gun =

Large-caliber naval gun

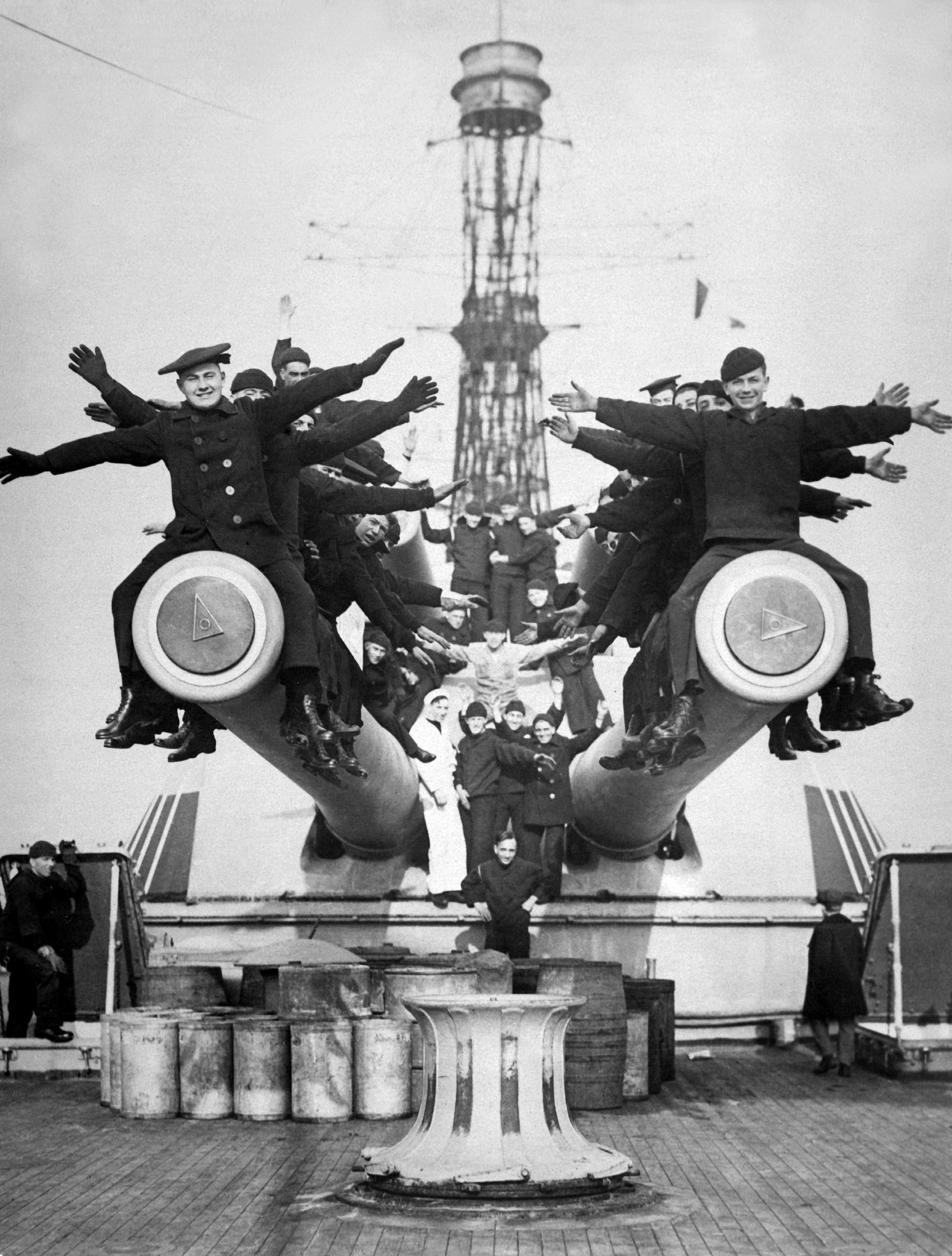
- Crewmen aboard USS Texas pause to have their picture taken on top of one of the twin 14-inch/45-caliber gun turrets, 1918.
- Type: Naval gun; Coastal defence
- Place of origin: United States

Service history
- In service: 1914–1946
- Used by: United States Navy; Royal Navy
- Wars: World War I; World War II

Production history
- Designer: Bureau of Ordnance
- Designed: Mark 1: 1910; Mark 8: 1928
- Manufacturer: U.S. Naval Gun Factory; Bethlehem Steel
- Variants: Marks 1–3, 5, 8–10, 12

Specifications
- Mass: Mark 1: 140,670 lb (63,810 kg) (without breech); Mark 1: 142,492 lb (64,633 kg) (with breech); Mark 8: 124,000 lb (56,000 kg)
- Length: 53 ft 6.5 in (16.32 m)
- Barrel length: 52 ft 6 in (16.00 m) bore (45 calibers)
- Shell: Mark 8: 1,402 lb (636 kg) Armor-piercing (AP); AP Mark 16: 1,500 lb (680 kg) AP; HC Mark 19: 1,125 lb (510 kg) High explosive (HC)
- Caliber: 14 in (360 mm)
- Recoil: 40 in (1,000 mm)
- Elevation: Unmodernized turret: -5° to +15°; Modernized turret: -5° to +30°
- Traverse: -150° to 150°
- Rate of fire: 1.25–1.75 rounds per minute
- Muzzle velocity: Original charge: 2,600 ft/s (790 m/s) AP; Enlarged charge: 2,700 ft/s (820 m/s) AP; Reduced charge: 1,935 ft/s (590 m/s) AP; Full charge: 2,735 ft/s (834 m/s) HC; Reduced charge: 2,065 ft/s (629 m/s) HC
- Effective firing range: 13,000 yd (12,000 m) at 7.4° elevation
- Maximum firing range: Unmodernized turret: 23,000 yd (21,000 m) at 15° elevation; Modernized turret: 34,300 yd (31,400 m) at 30° elevation

The 14-inch/45-caliber gun, (spoken "fourteen-inch-forty-five-caliber"), whose variations were known initially as the Mark 1, 2, 3, and 5, and, when upgraded in the 1930s, were redesignated as the Mark 8, 9, 10, and 12. They were the first 14-inch (356 mm) guns to be employed by the United States Navy. The 14-inch/45-caliber guns were installed as the primary armament aboard all of the United States Navy's New York-class, Nevada-class, and Pennsylvania-class battleships. The gun also saw service in the British Royal Navy, where it was designated BL 14-inch gun Mk II.

== History ==
The design of the 14-inch/45-caliber dates to about 1910. They entered service in 1914 aboard Texas and her sister ship New York shortly after. At the time of their introduction they were intended to fire 1,400 lb (640 kg) armor-piercing (AP) projectiles containing a bursting charge of explosive D. Propellant charge was four silk bags of smokeless powder, each of which weighed 105 lb (48 kg). At a 15-degree angle, the guns could fire a shell out to 23,000 yd (21,000 m). Each individual gun weighed 142,492 lb (64,633 kg) with the breech and measured 53 ft 6.5 in (16.32 m) in length.

Each of the original Mark 1 built-up guns consisted of a tube without liner, jacket, eight hoops and a screw box liner. To compensate for the problem of gun drooping, four hoop-locking rings were added to the guns. The Mark 3 added three hoop locking rings and contained a longer slide, while the Mark 5 had five hoops total. Owing to the interchangeability of the guns, the battleships fitted with the 14-inch/45-caliber guns often had guns of various Marks installed on each turret.

In the 1930s, the Mark 1, 2, 3, and 5 were upgraded to allow for increased charges and muzzle velocities, resulting in the Mark 8, 9, 10, and 12, respectively. All guns employed a Welin breech block and used a Smith-Asbury mechanism, and, in the case of the Mark 12, chromium plating was introduced to prolong barrel life. These improvements enabled the guns to fire heavier 1,500 lb (680 kg) shells, and increasing the gun mount elevation to 30 degrees extended the range of the guns to 36,000 yd (33,000 m). The New York-class did not have their turrets modernized because their shell hoists could not accommodate the longer AP and HC shells; instead, a shorter version of shells with windshields were produced for them.

== Service ==
=== United States Navy ===
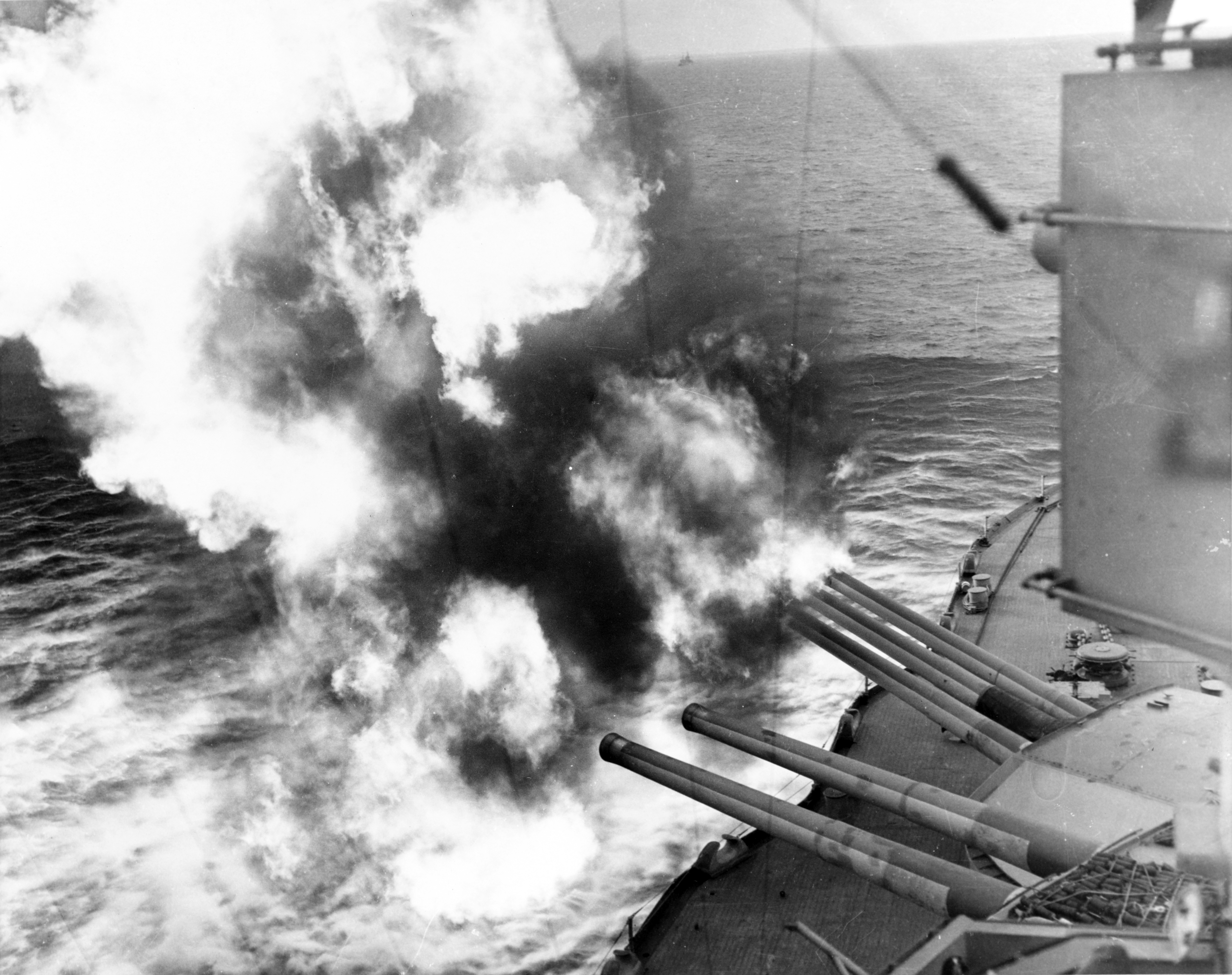
14-inch/45-caliber guns aboard the battleship Nevada fire at Utah Beach during Operation Overlord in 1944.

The guns on the two battleships of the New York-class, New York and Texas, the first ship of the Nevada-class, Nevada and the first ship of the Pennsylvania-class, Pennsylvania, saw service in World War II in the role of shore bombardment. New York and Texas bombarded North Africa during landings in 1942, Pennsylvania took part in the Aleutian Islands Campaign and Texas and Nevada shelled Normandy during Operation Overlord in 1944. Throughout 1944 and 1945, Pennsylvania hit many different Pacific islands during their invasions, while New York, Texas and Nevada all took part in the invasion of Iwo Jima and the invasion of Okinawa in 1945.

As they were sunk in the Japanese attack on Pearl Harbor, both Oklahoma and Arizona never fired their main batteries in combat. Three guns removed from Arizona that in the relining process at the time of Pearl Harbor were installed aboard Nevada in fall 1944 and were used in several shore bombardments in the Pacific. The aft turrets from Arizona (numbers 3 and 4) were salvaged from the wreck and used for United States Army Coast Artillery Corps Battery Arizona on the west coast of Oahu and Battery Pennsylvania on Mokapu Point.

=== Royal Navy ===
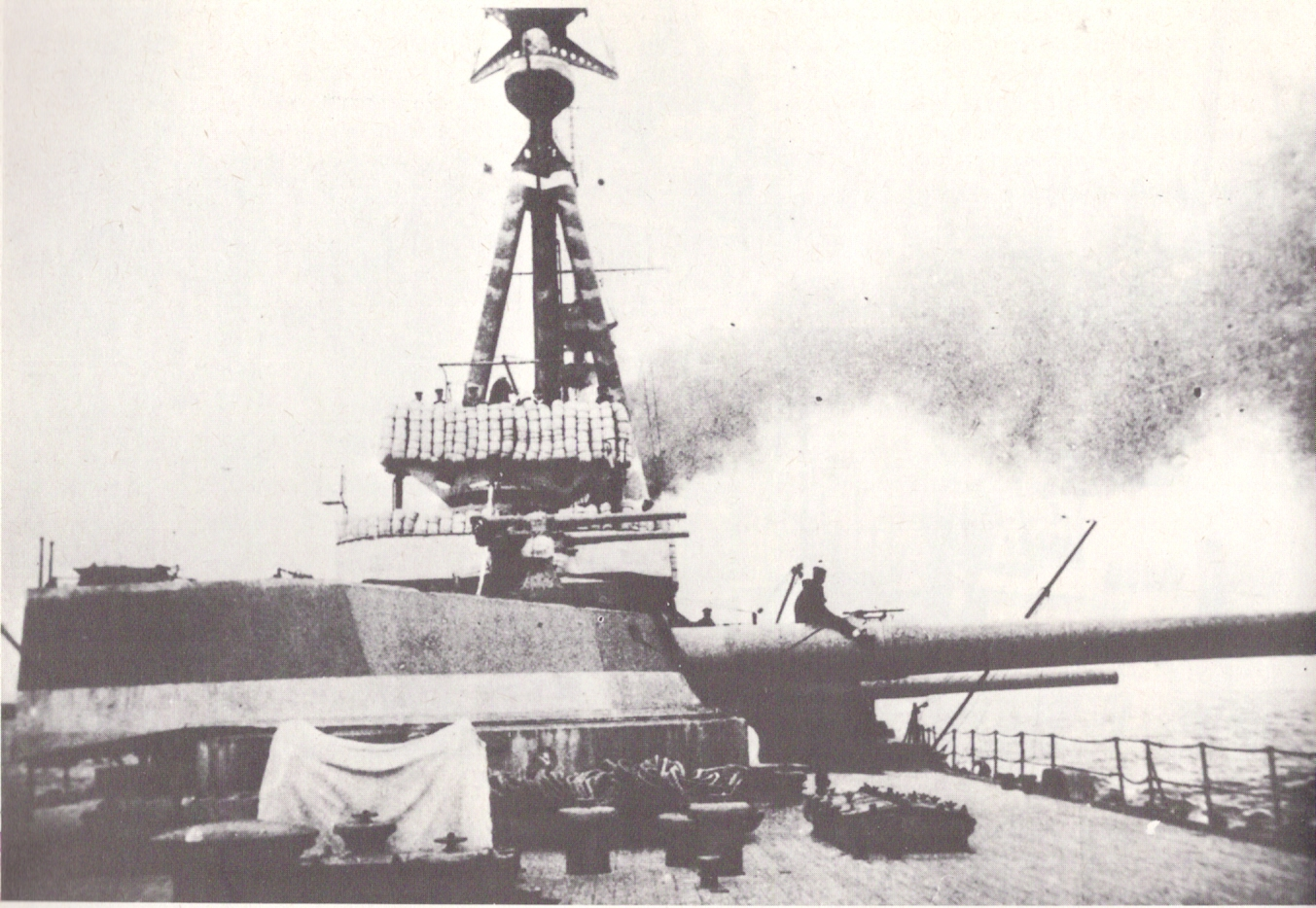
The single 14-inch gun turret of a British Abercrombie-class monitor during World War I.

Eight US Navy standard 14-inch/45-caliber guns, complete with mountings, were built by Bethlehem Steel for the Greek battleship Salamis under construction in Germany. When World War I started, Bethlemen Steel cancelled the sale and offered the guns for purchase by the United Kingdom. The UK agreed to buy them and drew up a design for four monitors. These ships were to have been named after American military leaders but, as the United States was neutral, entered service as the Abercrombie-class with the British service designation "BL 14-inch gun Mk II". Under the British bore-measuring scheme, they were recorded as 44.5 calibers long.

Woolwich Arsenal built two more guns after the same pattern but using wire-wound techniques. Two ex-USN guns were supplied as spares and designated BL 14-inch gun Mk IV due to the different tube makeup, and two US guns with Asbury roller cams were designated Mark V.

In British service it was noted that it took a few shots before the guns warmed up and barrels straightened as the tubes locked together.

The ships were built quickly enough that they could sail to the Eastern Mediterranean in 1915 and participate in the Gallipoli campaign bombarding Ottoman positions.

== Naval service ==
Ship	Gun mounting
USS New York (BB-34)	5 × twin-gun turrets
USS Texas (BB-35)	5 × twin-gun turrets
USS Nevada (BB-36)	2 × twin-gun turrets 2 × triple-gun turrets
USS Oklahoma (BB-37)	2 × twin-gun turrets 2 × triple-gun turrets
USS Pennsylvania (BB-38)	4 × triple-gun turrets
USS Arizona (BB-39)	4 × triple-gun turrets
HMS Abercrombie	1 × twin-gun turret
HMS Havelock	1 × twin-gun turret
HMS Raglan	1 × twin-gun turret
HMS Roberts	1 × twin-gun turret

== Surviving examples ==
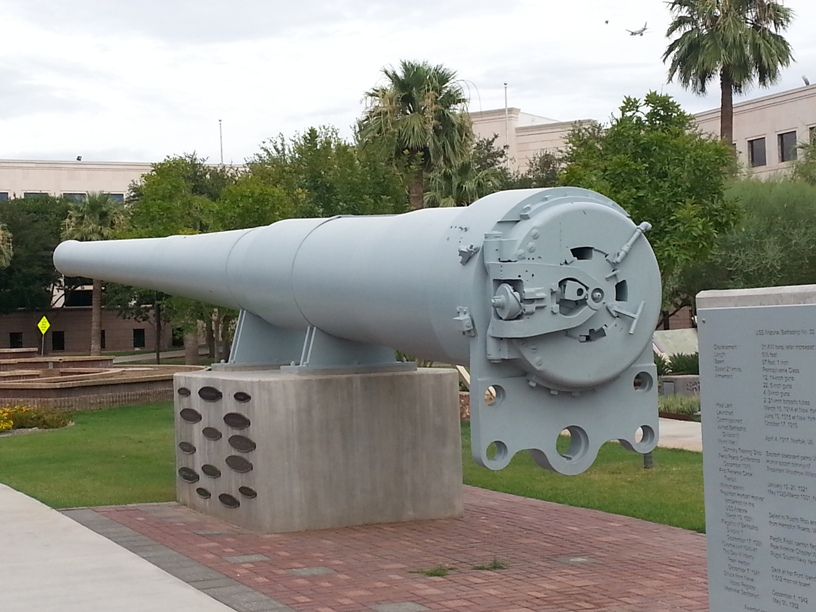
14-inch gun formerly on USS Arizona, displayed near the Arizona State House, Phoenix, Arizona

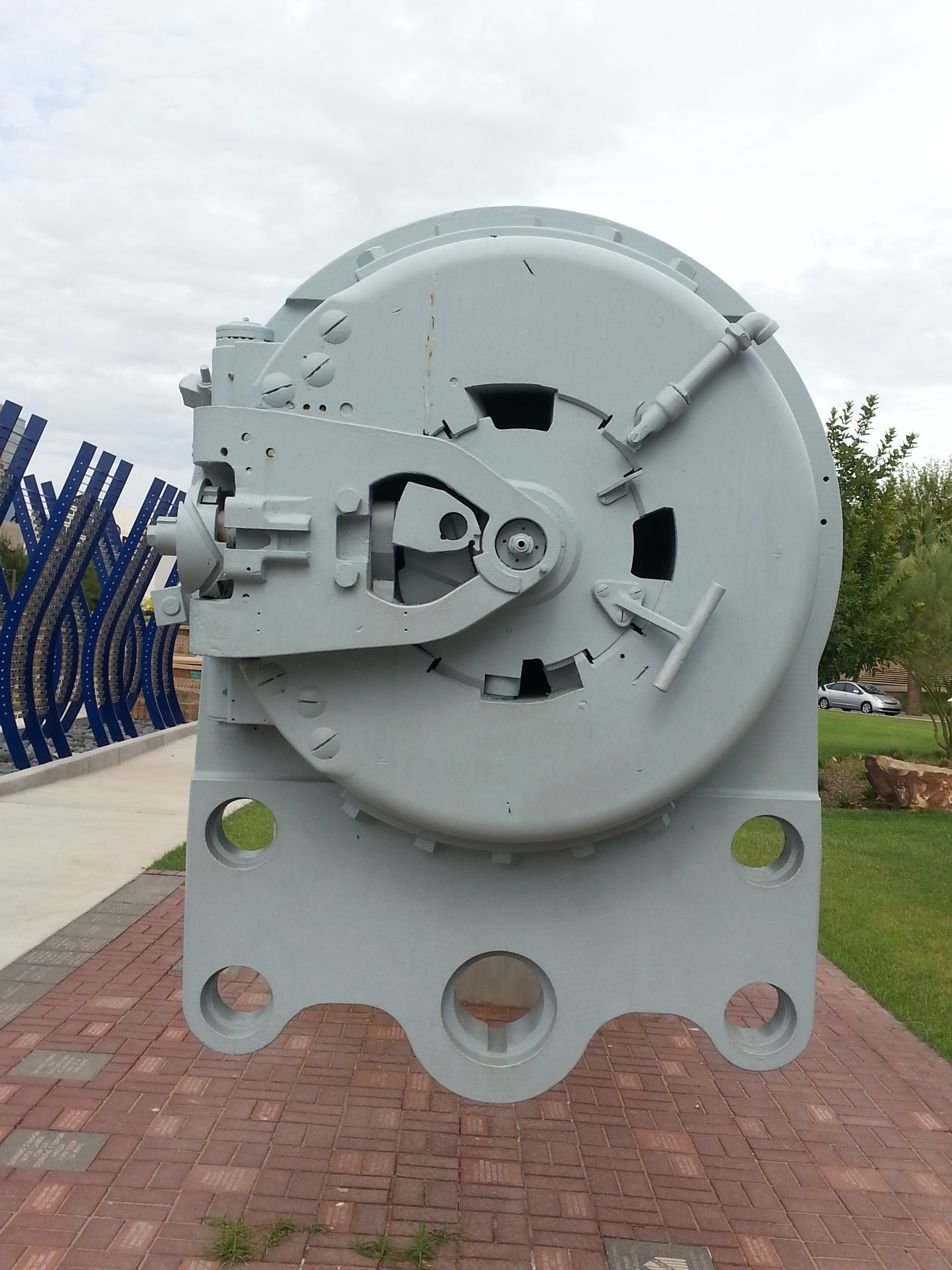
The breech of the restored USS Arizona gun barrel in Phoenix, Arizona.

- On USS Texas (BB-35), as of 2024 docked in Galveston, Texas. Texas has 9 out of 10 of her original 14-inch gun barrels that served on her from 1914 to 1923. These nine guns served with Pennsylvania from 1925 to 1940. They were refurbished, relined, and reinstalled on Texas in late 1944. The serial numbers for these 10 guns on Texas are 2, 3, 4, 5, 8, 9, 10, 12, 14, 25. Texas was the first ever battleship to be outfitted with 14-inch guns.
- Wesley Bolin Memorial Plaza, memorial to USS Arizona and World War II, Phoenix, Arizona; one of three previously on Arizona that served on Nevada in World War II.
- Pennsylvania Military Museum, Boalsburg, Pennsylvania.

== See also ==
- 14-inch/50-caliber gun – later 14-inch gun (American)
- BL 14-inch Mk VII naval gun – for British Royal Navy King George V-class battleships (1939)
- Greek battleship Salamis

=== Weapons of comparable role, performance and era ===
- 14-inch gun M1910 US Army coast defense equivalent
- EOC 14-inch /45 naval gun contemporary British equivalent
- Vickers 14-inch/45 naval gun contemporary Vickers-designed Japanese equivalent
- 340mm/45 Modèle 1912 gun contemporary French naval gun

== Bibliography ==
- Lewis, E. R. & Kirchner, D. P. (1992). "The Oahu Turrets". Warship International. XXIX (3): 273–301. ISSN 0043-0374.
- Crossley, Jim (2013). Monitors of the Royal Navy; How the Fleet Brought the Great Guns to Bear. Barnsley, UK: Pen & Sword. ISBN 978-1-78383-004-6.
