= Abercrombie-class monitor =

1915 class of British warships

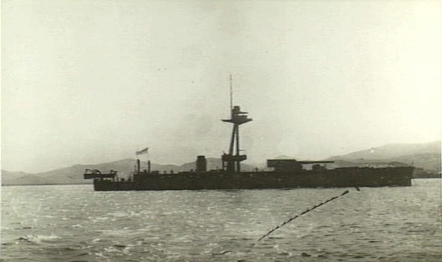
- The starboard profile of HMS Abercrombie off Gallipoli in July 1915

Class overview
- Name: Abercrombie
- Operators: Royal Navy
- Preceded by: Humber class
- Succeeded by: Lord Clive class
- Completed: 4
- Lost: 1
- Scrapped: 3

General characteristics
- Type: Monitor
- Displacement: 6,150 long tons (6,249 t)
- Length: 334 ft 6 in (101.96 m) oa
- Beam: 90 ft 2 in (27.48 m)
- Draught: 10 ft (3.0 m)
- Installed power: 2,310 ihp (1,720 kW)
- Propulsion: 2 × vertical triple expansion reciprocating engines, 2 × boilers, 2 × screws (HMS Raglan)
- Speed: 6 1/2 kn (12.0 km/h; 7.5 mph) (HMS Raglan)
- Complement: 198
- Armament: 2 × BL 14 inch gun Mk II 45 cal guns; 2 × QF 12 pounder 18 cwt naval gun; 1 × 3 pounder (47 mm) anti-aircraft gun; 1 × 2-pounder Mark II anti-aircraft gun
- Armour: Belt: 4 in (102 mm); Deck 2–1 in (51–25 mm); Barbettes: 8 in (203 mm); Turrets: 10 in (254 mm)
- Aircraft carried: 1 × seaplane (designed but seldom carried)

The Abercrombie class of monitors served in the Royal Navy during the First World War.

== History ==
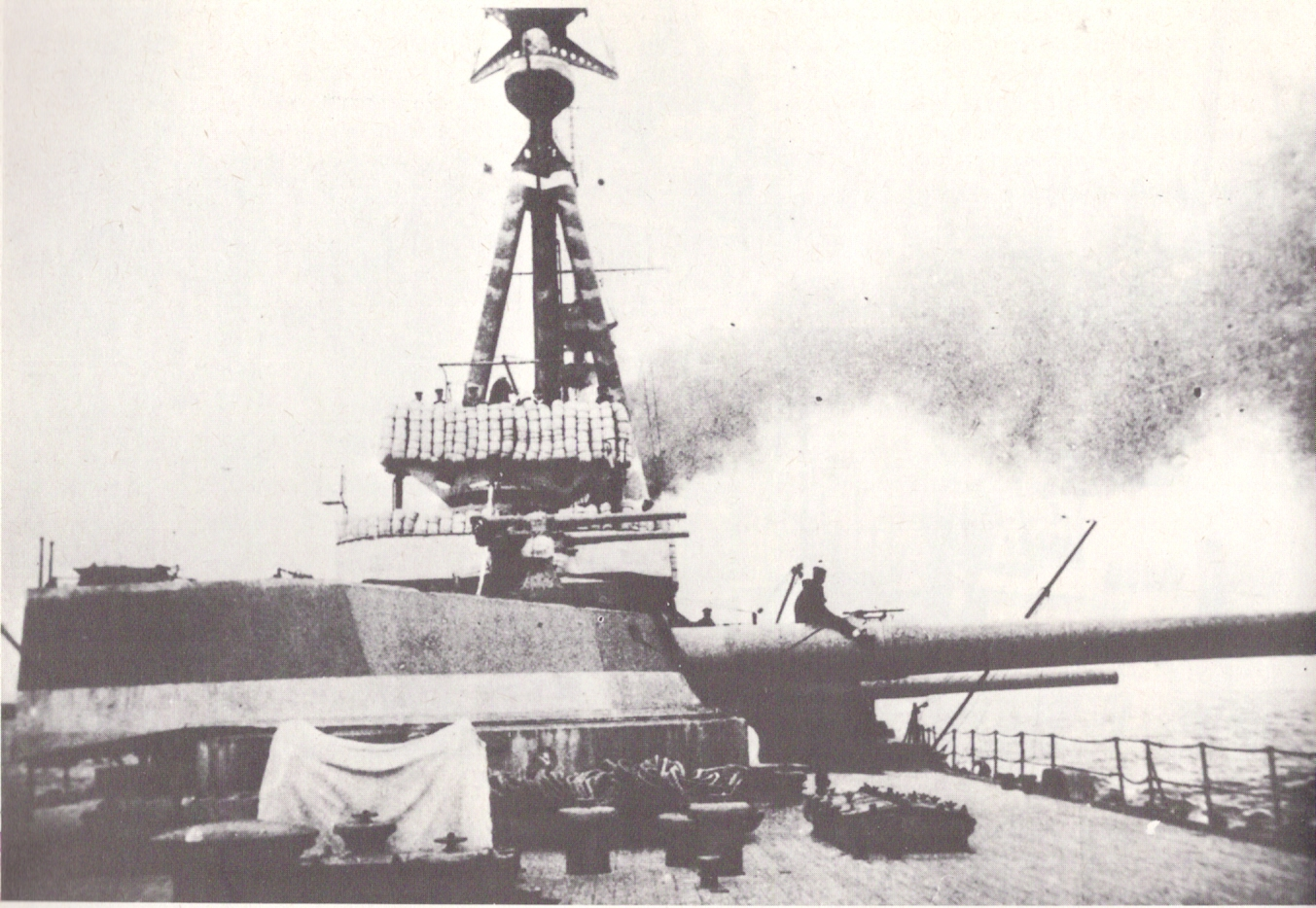
The 14-inch (356 mm) gun turret of an Abercrombie-class monitor during World War I. It mounted two 14-inch (356 mm) Mark II guns.

The four ships in this class came about when the contracted supplier of the main armament for the Greek battleship Salamis being built in Germany was unable to supply due to the British blockade. The company – Bethlehem Steel in the United States – instead offered to sell the four 14 in (356 mm) twin gun turrets to the Royal Navy on 3 November 1914.

A design for a shallow-draught warship (known as "Monitors") suitable for shore-bombardment was quickly designed and built to use these turrets. Preliminary studies was completed by AM Worthington, the handed over to Charles Lillicrap to complete, which was done within a week. The ships were laid down and launched within six months.

The ships carried a single main gun turret forward of a tripod mast, which was itself in front of a single funnel. A secondary armament of two 12-pounder (76 mm) guns was fitted, with a single 3-pounder (47 mm) anti-aircraft gun, with a 2-pounder pom-pom completing the ships armament.

The monitors had a box-like hull, with very bluff bow and stern, and were fitted with anti-torpedo bulges. In order to speed construction, it was intended to use off-the shelf merchant ship engines, giving about 2,000 indicated horsepower (1,500 kW), which were expected to drive the ships to 10 knots (19 km/h; 12 mph). The rushed design, however, meant that the ships were much slower than expected – Raglan's engines gave 2,310 indicated horsepower (1,720 kW) but the ship could only reach 6 1/2 knots (12.0 km/h; 7.5 mph).

During the planning and build, they were to be the Styx-class named after four American figures; General Ulysses S. Grant, General Robert E. Lee, Admiral David Farragut and General Stonewall Jackson and they were launched under these names. Because the United States was still a neutral power at that time, using these names would have been undiplomatic and so they were renamed as simply M1 through M4 before completion, then receiving their final names.

The design included a seaplane for spotting the guns, but it was found that land-based aircraft were more effective; as monitors, they would never operate in the open sea, and storing the seaplane on top of the turret meant it had to be removed to avoid damage, even if not required before the guns could fire.

These monitors had flat bottoms, barges with bulges and were intended to have a speed of 10 knots. The Haslar model tests showed this would not be achieved, but the monitors were already in production. In practice their top speed was 6 knots.

== Ships ==
Ship	Namesake	Builders	Launched	Commissioned	Fate
Abercrombie (Initially Farragut, then M1, then General Abercrombie)	James Abercrombie	Harland & Wolff, Belfast	15 April 1915	1 May 1915	Paid off after the Armistice and sold for scrap to Thos. W Ward, Inverkeithing in 1927.
Havelock (Initially General Grant, then M2)	Henry Havelock	Harland & Wolff, Belfast	29 April 1915		Sold in 1921 for breaking up to Thos W Ward, Preston, broken up 1927
Raglan (Initially Robert E Lee, then M3, then Lord Raglan)	FitzRoy Somerset, 1st Baron Raglan	Harland and Wolff, Govan,	29 April 1915	May 1915	Sunk during the Battle of Imbros in January 1918, by battlecruiser Yavuz Sultan Selim
Roberts (initially Stonewall Jackson, then M4, then Lord Roberts	Frederick Roberts, 1st Earl Roberts	Swan Hunter, Wallsend,	15 April 1915	21 May 1915	Used as a static drillship after the First World War, scrapped in 1936

== Bibliography ==
- Bacon, Reginald (1919). The Dover Patrol 1915–1917. (2 vols.). New York: George H. Doran Co. Vol. 1 • Vol. 2
- Buxton, Ian (2008) [1978]. Big Gun Monitors: Design, Construction and Operations 1914–1945 (2nd Revised ed.). Barnsley, UK: Seaforth Publishing. ISBN 978-1-84415-719-8.
- Crossley, Jim (2013). Monitors of the Royal Navy; How the Fleet Brought the Great Guns to Bear. Barnsley, UK: Pen & Sword. ISBN 978-1-78383-004-6.
- Dittmar, F. J. & Colledge, J. J., "British Warships 1914–1919", (Ian Allan, London, 1972), ISBN 0-7110-0380-7
- Dunn, Steve R (2017). Securing the Narrow Sea: The Dover Patrol 1914–1918. Barnsley, UK: Seaforth Publishing. ISBN 978-1-84832-251-6.
- Friedman, Norman (2011). Naval Weapons of World War One: Guns, Torpedoes, Mines and ASW Weapons of All Nations; An Illustrated Directory. Barnsley: Seaforth Publishing. ISBN 978-1-84832-100-7.
- Gray, Randal (ed), "Conway's All the World's Fighting Ships 1906–1921", (Conway Maritime Press, London, 1985), ISBN 0-85177-245-5
- Parkes, Oscar; Prendergast, Maurice, eds. (1969) [First published 1919]. Jane's Fighting Ships 1919 (reprint ed.). New York: Arco Publishing Co. ISBN 978-0-71534-716-4. OCLC 1902851.
