= Journal of the American Society of Naval Engineers =

Defunct English-language engineering journal

The Journal of the American Society of Naval Engineers was a journal published by the American Society of Naval Engineers between 1889 and 1962. Some volumes are available online through Google Books.
