= Jonathan Edmondson =

British-born historian

Academic background
- Education: B.A., M.A., PhD., University of Cambridge

Jonathan Charles Edmondson FRSC FRHistS (born 1959) is a British-born historian. He holds Full Professor and Distinguished Research Professorship status at York University and was elected a Fellow of the Royal Society of Canada and Fellow of the Royal Historical Society.

== Early life and education ==
Edmondson was born in 1959. He completed his education at the University of Cambridge before emigrating to Canada.

== Career ==
After earning his PhD, Edmondson joined the faculty at York University in 1987. Since the start of his time at York, he served as co-ordinator of the Programme in Classical Studies from 1995 to 1998, 2001 to 2005, and again from 2017 to 2020 and as chair of the Department of History from 2009 to 2013 and as acting chair in 1997-1998 and 2016-2017. As well, he served as associate editor of the journal Phoenix from 1989 to 1997 before becoming its editor from 1997 to 2002, since when he has edited the Phoenix Supplementary Series, published by the University of Toronto Press beginning in 1987. He also served as president of the Ontario Classical Association before stepping down in 2006. He was shortly thereafter chosen to become the new president of the Classical Association of Canada (CAC) from 2008 until 2010.

In 2003, Edmondson was elected as a Corresponding Member of Real Academia de la Historia (Royal Academy of History, Spain) and in 2009, while serving as chair of the Department of History, he was elected a Fellow of the Royal Historical Society. In 2011, he was the recipient of the Genio Protector de la Colonia Augusta Emerita prize by Spain's Ministry of Culture and the Museo Nacional de Arte Romano, Mérida.

In 2014, Edmondson was the recipient of the Award of Merit from the Classical Association of Canada. The following year, he also sat on York's Research Release Adjudication Committee. In 2016, Edmondson was awarded York’s Faculty of Liberal Arts and Professional Studies Award for Distinction in Research, Creativity or Scholarship for his research on the Roman Empire, Roman inscriptions and Roman social history. In 2017, York University named Edmondson a Distinguished Research Professorship. A Distinguished Research Professorship, according to York, was awarded to someone who has made outstanding contributions to the university through research.

In 2018, Edmondson received a Partnership Development Grant from the Social Sciences and Humanities Research Council of Canada to research "Names and identity in Roman Spain: the ADOPIA project." The same year he was elected, Edmondson received a diploma due to his role as a corresponding member of the Deutsches Archäologisches Institut. In September, he was one of three York professors elected to the Royal Society of Canada. After ten years’ service on the international committee of the Association Internationale d’Épigraphique grecque et latine (AIEGL) from 2008 to 2017, in 2020 he was elected vice-president of the American Society of Greek and Latin Epigraphy (ASGLE) for a two-year term, to become president in 2022 and 2023. He also published his book "Nueva Epigrafía Funeraria de Augusta Emerita (NEFAE): Tituli sepulcrales urbanos (ss. I-VII) y su contexto arqueológico." The book contained 199 unpublished funerary inscriptions from Augusta Emerita.

=== Publications ===
Edmondson has published a series of books on Roman Spain including Two Industries in Roman Lusitania: Mining and Garum Production (1987); Imagen y Memoria: Monumentos funerarios con retratos en la Colonia Augusta Emerita (2001); Granite Funerary Stelae from Augusta Emerita (2006) and Nueva Epigrafía Funeraria de Augusta Emerita (NEFAE): Tituli sepulcrales urbanos (ss. I-VII) y su contexto arqueológico (2019). Among his co-edited volumes are Law and Social Status in Classical Athens (with Virginia Hunter, 2000); Flavius Josephus and Flavian Rome (with Steve Mason and James B. Rives, 2005); Roman Dress and the Fabrics of Roman Culture and Roman Literary Cultures: Domestic Politics, Revolutionary Poetics, Civic Spectacle (both with Alison Keith, 2007, 2016) and The Oxford Handbook of Roman Epigraphy (with Christer Bruun, 2015), described as "the most complete collection of scholarship on Roman epigraphy." Since 1996, he has also published a series of articles on Roman spectacles, especially gladiatorial presentations.
