= Orality =

State of being oral

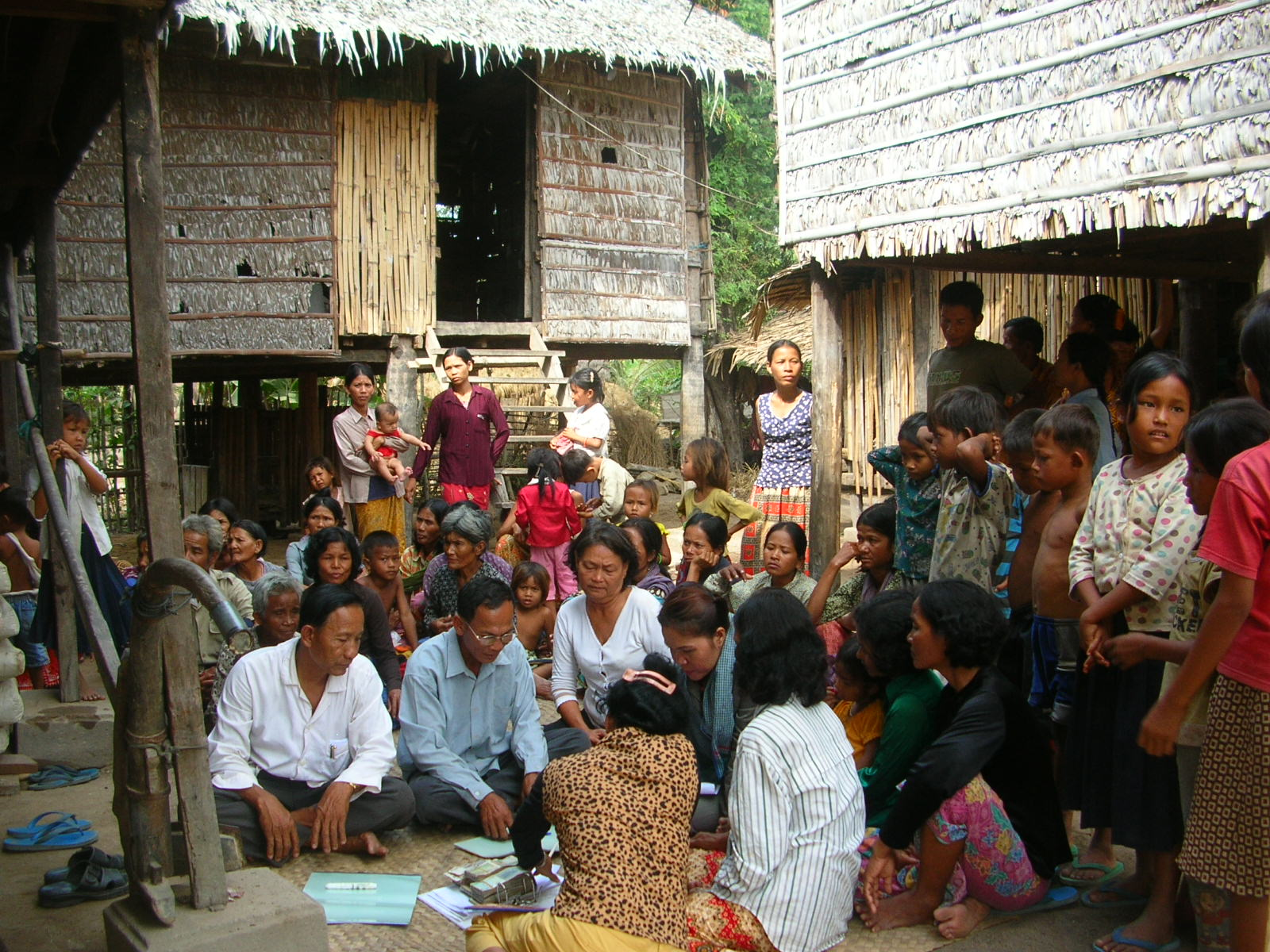
An oral community in Takéo, Cambodia, confronts writing. Modern scholarship has shown that orality is a complex and tenacious social phenomenon.

Orality is thought and verbal expression in societies, distinct from the technologies of literacy (especially writing and print). The study of orality is closely allied to the study of oral tradition.

The term "orality" has been used in a variety of ways, often to describe, in a generalised fashion, the structures of consciousness found in cultures that do not employ, or employ minimally, the technologies of writing.

Walter J. Ong's work was foundational for the study of orality, and exemplifies the fact that despite the striking success and subsequent power of written language, the vast majority of languages are never written, and the basic orality of language is permanent.

In his later publications Ong distinguishes between two forms of orality: 'primary orality' and 'secondary orality'. Primary orality refers to thought and expression un-touched by the culture of writing of print; secondary orality is explained by Ong as oral culture defined (implicitly influenced) by the written and printed word, and includes oral culture made possible by technology such as a newscaster reading a news report on television.

In addition, 'residual orality' is also defined – it is the remnants, legacy, or influence of a predominantly oral culture carried over into the written realm – an example might include the use of dialogue as a philosophical or didactic tool in written literature, such as used by the Greek thinker Plato.

== Origins of philosophy and definition ==
=== Impact of literacy on culture ===
Before writing became a way for many cultures, there was already orality. Unfortunately much of the retained orality has been lost or drastically changed. Those that were able to be preserved give us insight into past cultures and the scale of societal changes throughout history. In Orality and Literacy (2nd ed. Ong 2002), Ong sums up his own work over the previous three decades as well as the work of numerous other scholars. With regard to oral tradition and primary orality he draws on pioneering work by Milman Parry, Albert B. Lord, and Eric A. Havelock. Marshall McLuhan was among the first to fully appreciate the significance of the Ong's earlier work about print culture and the written and printed word as a technology. In his work, The Gutenberg Galaxy McLuhan 1962, McLuhan quotes and discusses works by Ong in the 1950s regarding print culture.

=== Primary orality ===
'Primary orality' refers to thought and its verbal expression within cultures "totally untouched by any knowledge of writing or print." Ong argues that the immediacy of sound, and the longevity of writing, correspond to the intrinsically different ways in which oral and literate societies and people function.

In his studies of the Homeric Question, Milman Parry was able to show that the poetic metre found in the Iliad and the Odyssey had been 'packaged' by oral Greek society to meet its information management needs. These insights first opened the door to a wider appreciation of the sophistication of oral traditions, and their various methods of managing information. Later, ancient and medieval mnemonic tools were extensively documented by Frances Yates in her book The Art of Memory (Yates 1966).

=== Residual orality ===
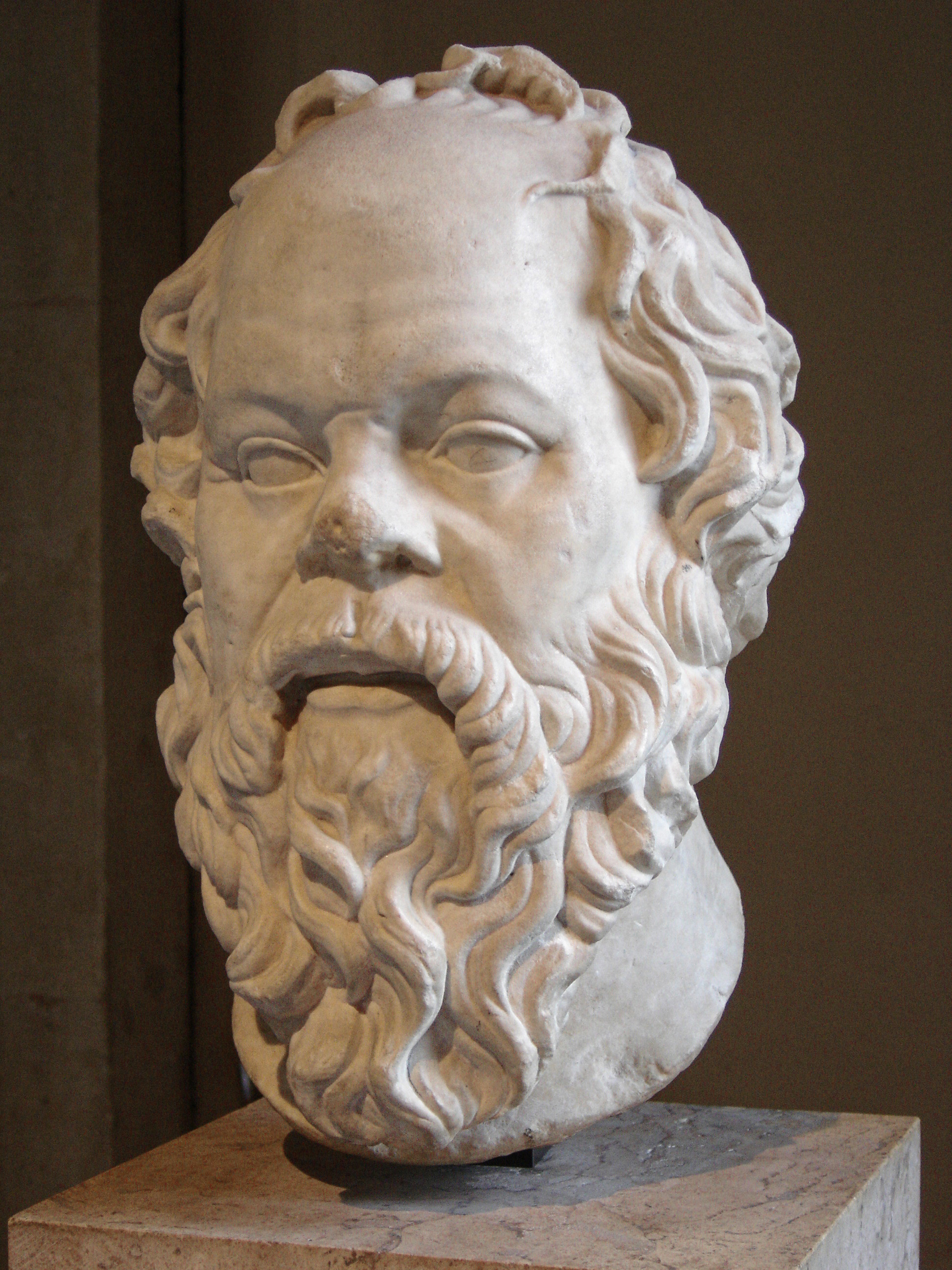
Socrates in Plato's Phaedrus, quoting the prophecy of Ammon (Thamus) : "[Writing] will produce forgetfulness in the minds of those who learn to use it, because they will not practice their memory. [..] You have invented an elixir not of memory, but of reminding; and you offer your pupils the appearance of wisdom, not true wisdom.." (trans. H.N. Fowler; Line 275)

‘Residual orality’ refers to thought and its verbal expression in cultures that have been exposed to writing and print, but have not fully ‘interiorized’ (in McLuhan's term) the use of these technologies in their daily lives. As a culture interiorizes the technologies of literacy, the ‘oral residue’ diminishes.

=== Importance of the concept ===
It has been a habit of literate cultures to view oral cultures simply in terms of their lack of the technologies of writing. This habit, argues Ong, is dangerously mislead. Oral cultures are living cultures in their own right. While literacy extends human possibilities in both thought and action, all literate technologies ultimately depend on the ability of humans to learn oral languages and then translate sound into symbolic imagery.

== Theory of the characteristics of oral culture ==
Drawing on hundreds of studies from anthropology, linguistics and the study of oral tradition, Ong summarizes ten key aspects of the 'psychodynamics of orality', including the following. These are subject to continuing debate.

- Formulaic styling: Information is expressed through common and repeated structures, for ease of memorization.
- Additive rather than subordinative: Oral cultures tend to avoid complex clause structures in sentences, rather opting for simpler and more sequential ones.
- Aggregative rather than analytic: Oral expression is characterized by habitual stock phrases which are used unaltered.
- Redundant or 'copious': A speaker may repeat concepts for emphasis and reconsideration throughout a story or discussion.
- Conservative or traditionalist: Because oral societies have no effective access to writing and print technologies, they must invest considerable energy in basic information management. To qualify for storage, information must usually concern matters of immediate practical concern, or familiarity to most members of the society.
- Situational rather than abstract: Concepts are used in a way that minimizes abstraction, focusing to the greatest extent possible on objects and situations directly known by the speaker.

== See also ==
- Art of memory
- Oral tradition
- Ethnopoetics
- History of communication
- History of writing
- Intangible culture
- Linguistic anthropology
- Oracy
- Oral contract
- Oral history
- Oral interpretation
- Oral law
- Oral poetry
- Performance poetry
- Public speaking
- Storytelling
- World Oral Literature Project
