= John Miles Foley =

American literary scholar (1947–2012)

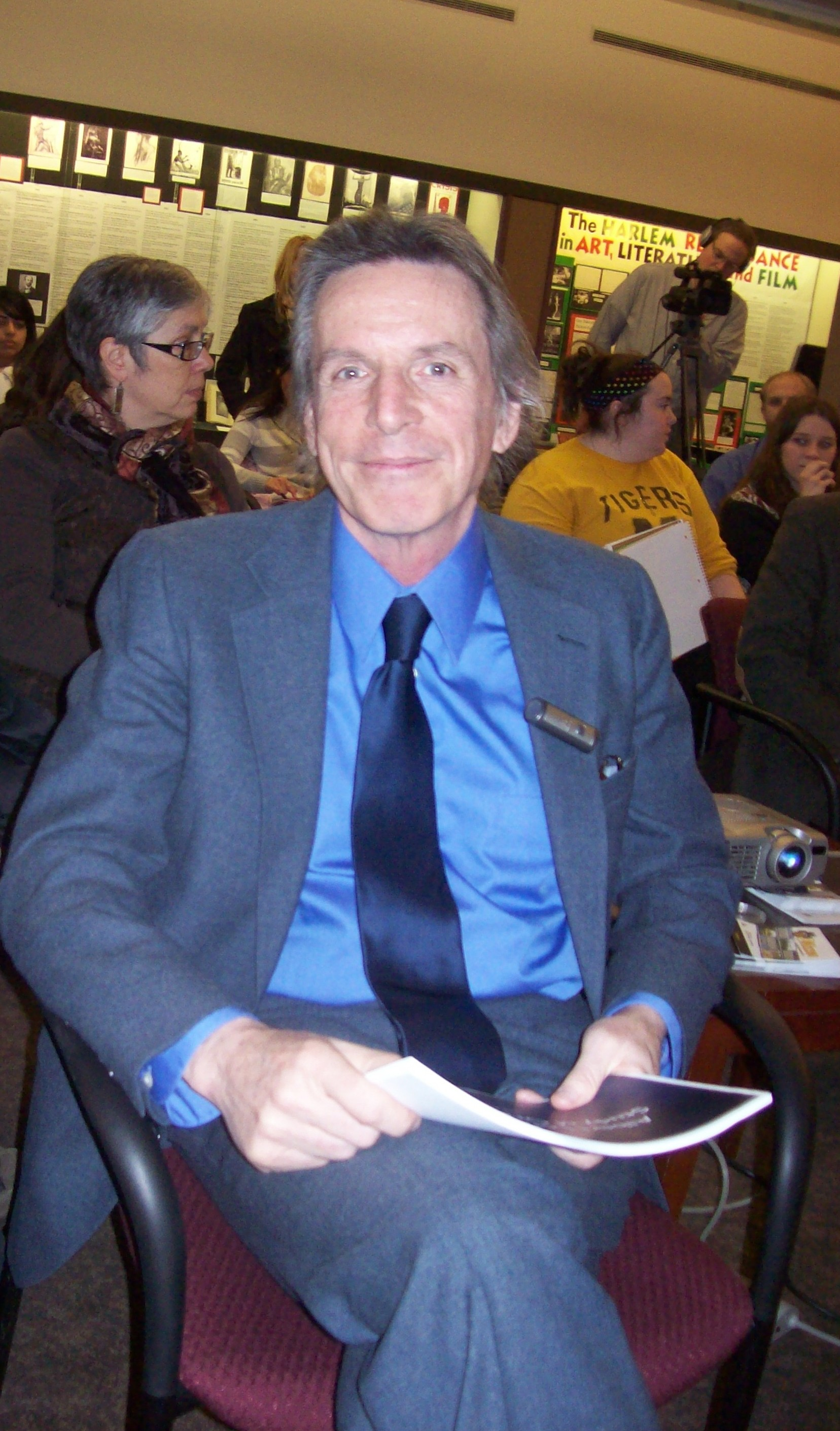
John Miles Foley

John Miles Foley (January 22, 1947 – May 3, 2012) was a scholar of comparative oral tradition, particularly medieval and Old English literature, Homer and Serbian epic. He was the founder of the academic journal Oral Tradition and the Center for Studies in Oral Tradition at the University of Missouri, where he was Curators' Professor of Classical Studies and English and W. H. Byler Endowed Chair in the Humanities.

== Education ==
Foley was born January 22, 1947, in Northampton, Massachusetts. He received his bachelor's degree at Colgate University in 1969, with majors in Physics, Mathematics and Chemistry. He completed his master's in English Literature at the University of Massachusetts/Amherst in 1971 before completing the Ph.D. there in English and Comparative Literature (1974).

== Career ==
Following his doctoral studies, Foley undertook fieldwork in Yugoslavia, confirming and extending prior research on living oral traditions by Milman Parry and Albert Lord. Based on this fieldwork, he continued the work of Francis P. Magoun in applying findings to other ethnolinguistic areas, as well as refining the theory of Oral-Formulaic Composition.

After receiving his doctorate, Foley was assistant professor of English at Emory University until 1979, when he became associate professor at the University of Missouri, where he became regular professor in 1983 and stayed for the remainder of his career. Stints at other universities included an appointment as visiting professor at the University of Belgrade (1980) and visiting fellow at Harvard University (1976–1977, 1980–1981). He directed summer institutes for teachers for the National Endowment for the Humanities in 1987, 1989, 1991, 1992 and 1994.

He gave more than 250 invited lectures throughout the United States as well as in China, India, Russia, Mongolia, Japan, throughout Africa and Europe, and the United States.

Foley was awarded grants and fellowships from the American Council of Learned Societies, the Guggenheim Foundation, the National Endowment for the Humanities, the Fulbright Program, the Mellon Foundation, and other institutions, and was a fellow of the Finnish Folklore Society and the American Folklore Society.

In addition to providing the infrastructure for the comparatively new academic discipline of oral tradition by means of organizing conferences, producing the first bibliography, history and methodological guide and classroom textbook on the subject, his principal contributions involved the study of oral traditional performance in the field, and the application of those observations both to ancient texts and to the emerging secondary orality of the Internet.

He taught in the departments of Classical Studies (of which he was chair from 1996 to 1999), including both literature and language, English ( Anglo-Saxon language and Beowulf), and German and Russian Studies (Slavic languages and literature). Additionally, he had been an adjunct professor of anthropology since 1992.

Foley founded the academic journal Oral Tradition in 1986, converting it to an open access publishing model in 2006. He also founded and directed two academic centers, the Center for the Studies in Oral Tradition (launched in 1986) and the center for eResearch (launched in 2005), which fosters cross-disciplinary internet-related research. He wrote or edited twenty books, and authored more than 160 scholarly articles. Choice: Current Reviews for Academic Libraries did a retrospective of his work in 2001. Additionally, he edited three series of books (Lord Studies in Oral Tradition, published by Garland, Voices in Performance and Text, by the University of Illinois Press, and Poetics of Orality and Literacy, with the University of Notre Dame Press).

Foley was most recently the Academic Director for the Oral Traditions program at the Graduate Institute.

Foley retired from the University of Missouri in 2011, and died May 3, 2012, at the age of 65.

== Select bibliography ==
- Oral-Formulaic Theory and Research: An Introduction and Annotated Bibliography. New York, 1985.
- Traditional Oral Epic: The Odyssey, Beowulf, and the Serbo-Croatian Return Song. Berkeley, 1990 Rpt. 1993.
- Immanent Art: From Structure to Meaning in Traditional Oral Epic. Bloomington, 1991.
- The Theory of Oral Composition: History and Methodology. Bloomington, 1988. Rpt. 1992.
- The Singer of Tales in Performance. Bloomington, 1995.
- Teaching Oral Traditions (ed.). New York, 1998.
- Homer's Traditional Art. Penn State UP, 1999.
- How To Read an Oral Poem. Illinois UP, 2002.
- A Companion to Ancient Epic. Blackwell, 2005
- Oral Tradition and the Internet: Pathways of the Mind. University of Illinois Press, 2012.

== See also ==
- Oral-formulaic composition
- Francis Peabody Magoun
- Albert Lord
