= Oral tradition =

Culture preserved through speech or song

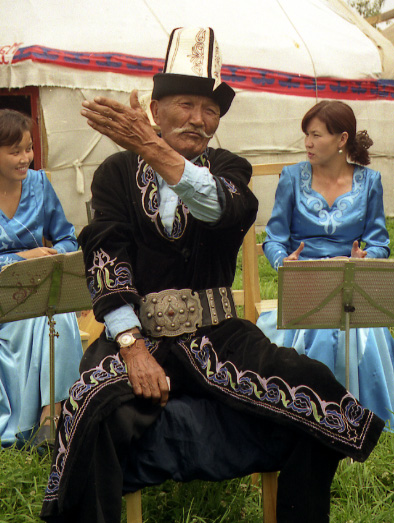
A traditional Kyrgyz manaschi performing part of the Epic of Manas at a yurt camp in Karakol

Oral tradition, or oral lore, is a form of human communication in which knowledge, art, beliefs, ideas and culture are received, preserved, and transmitted orally from one generation to another. The transmission is through speech or song and may include folktales, ballads, chants, prose or poetry. The information is mentally recorded by oral repositories, sometimes termed "walking libraries", who are usually also performers. Oral tradition is a medium of communication for a society to transmit oral history, oral literature, oral law and other knowledge across generations without a writing system, or in parallel to a writing system. It is the most widespread medium of human communication. They often remain in use in the modern era throughout for cultural preservation.

Religions such as Buddhism, Hinduism, Catholicism, Yazidism and Jainism have used oral tradition, in parallel to writing, to transmit their canonical scriptures, rituals, hymns and mythologies. African societies have broadly been labelled oral civilisations, contrasted with literate civilisations, due to their reverence for the oral word and widespread use of oral tradition. (Note: This characterisation has come under criticism by some African scholars, as it implies conflict between the oral and written. They instead contend that in reality, the characterisation is defined by the interaction between three ways of expression and diffusion: the oral, the written, and the printed word. Bethwell Allan Ogot notes that images of Africa composed by Western writers have often been in terms of "opposites" and how they differ from "us".)

Oral tradition is memories, knowledge, and expression held in common by a group over many generations: it is the long preservation of immediate or contemporaneous testimony. It may be defined as the recall and transmission of specific, preserved textual and cultural knowledge through vocal utterance. Oral tradition is usually popular, and can be exoteric or esoteric. It speaks to people according to their understanding, unveiling itself in accordance with their aptitudes.

As an academic discipline, oral tradition refers both to objects and methods of study. It is distinct from oral history, which is the recording of personal testimony of those who experienced historical eras or events. Oral tradition is also distinct from the study of orality, defined as thought and its verbal expression in societies where the technologies of literacy (writing and print) are unfamiliar. Folklore is one albeit not the only type of oral tradition.

== History ==
According to John Foley, oral tradition has been an ancient human tradition found in "all corners of the world". Modern archaeology has been unveiling evidence of the human efforts to preserve and transmit arts and knowledge that depended completely or partially on an oral tradition, across various cultures:

The Judeo-Christian Bible reveals its oral traditional roots; medieval European manuscripts are penned by performing scribes; geometric vases from archaic Greece mirror Homer's oral style. (...) Indeed, if these final decades of the millennium have taught us anything, it must be that oral tradition never was the other we accused it of being; it never was the primitive, preliminary technology of communication we thought it to be. Rather, if the whole truth is told, oral tradition stands out as the single most dominant communicative technology of our species as both a historical fact and, in many areas still, a contemporary reality.

— John Foley, Signs of Orality

Before the introduction of text, oral tradition remained the only means of communication in order to establish societies as well as its institutions. Despite widespread comprehension of literacy in the recent century, oral tradition remains the dominant communicative means within the world.

=== Africa ===
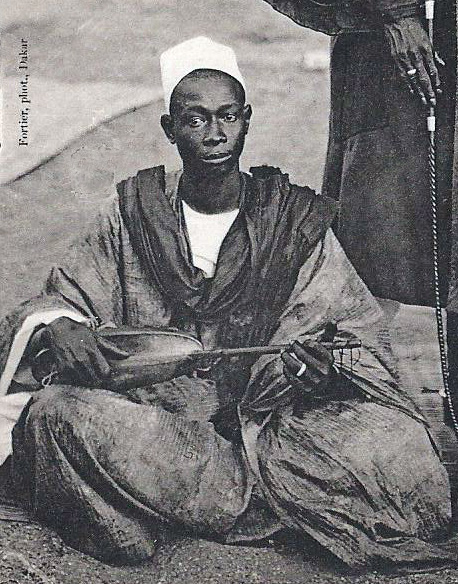
Griot for a native ruler in Senegal

In Africa, the oral tradition includes proverbs, folktales, songs, dances, customs, traditional medicine, religious practices, and cultural sayings that are told and expressed to teach lessons about life, social systems, religion, and spirituality. All indigenous African societies use oral tradition to learn their origin and history, civic and religious duties, crafts and skills, as well as traditional myths and legends. It is also a key socio-cultural component in the practice of their traditional spiritualities, as well as mainstream Abrahamic religions. Jan Vansina differentiates between oral and literate civilisations, stating: "The attitude of members of an oral society toward speech is similar to the reverence members of a literate society attach to the written word. If it is hallowed by authority or antiquity, the word will be treasured." For centuries in Europe, all data felt to be important were written down, with the most important texts prioritised, such as Bible, and only trivia, such as song, legend, anecdote, and proverbs remained unrecorded. In Africa, all the principal political, legal, social, and religious texts were transmitted orally. When the Bamums in Cameroon invented a script, the first to be written down was the royal chronicle and the code of customary law. Most African courts had archivists who learnt by heart the royal genealogy and history of the state, and served as its unwritten constitution.

The performance of a tradition is accentuated and rendered alive by various gesture, social conventions and the unique occasion in which it is performed. Furthermore, the climate in which traditions are told influences its content. In Burundi, traditions were short because most were told at informal gatherings and everyone had to have their turn; in neighbouring Rwanda, many narratives were longer because a one-man professional had to entertain his patron for a whole evening, with every production checked by fellow specialists and errors punishable. Frequently, glosses or commentaries were presented parallel to the narrative, sometimes answering questions from the audience to ensure understanding, although often someone would learn a tradition without asking their master questions and not really understand the meaning of its content, leading them to speculate in the commentary. Oral traditions only exist when they are told, except for in people's minds, and so the frequency of telling a tradition aids its preservation. These African ethnic groups also utilize oral tradition to develop and train the human intellect, and the memory to retain information and sharpen imagination.

==== West Africa ====
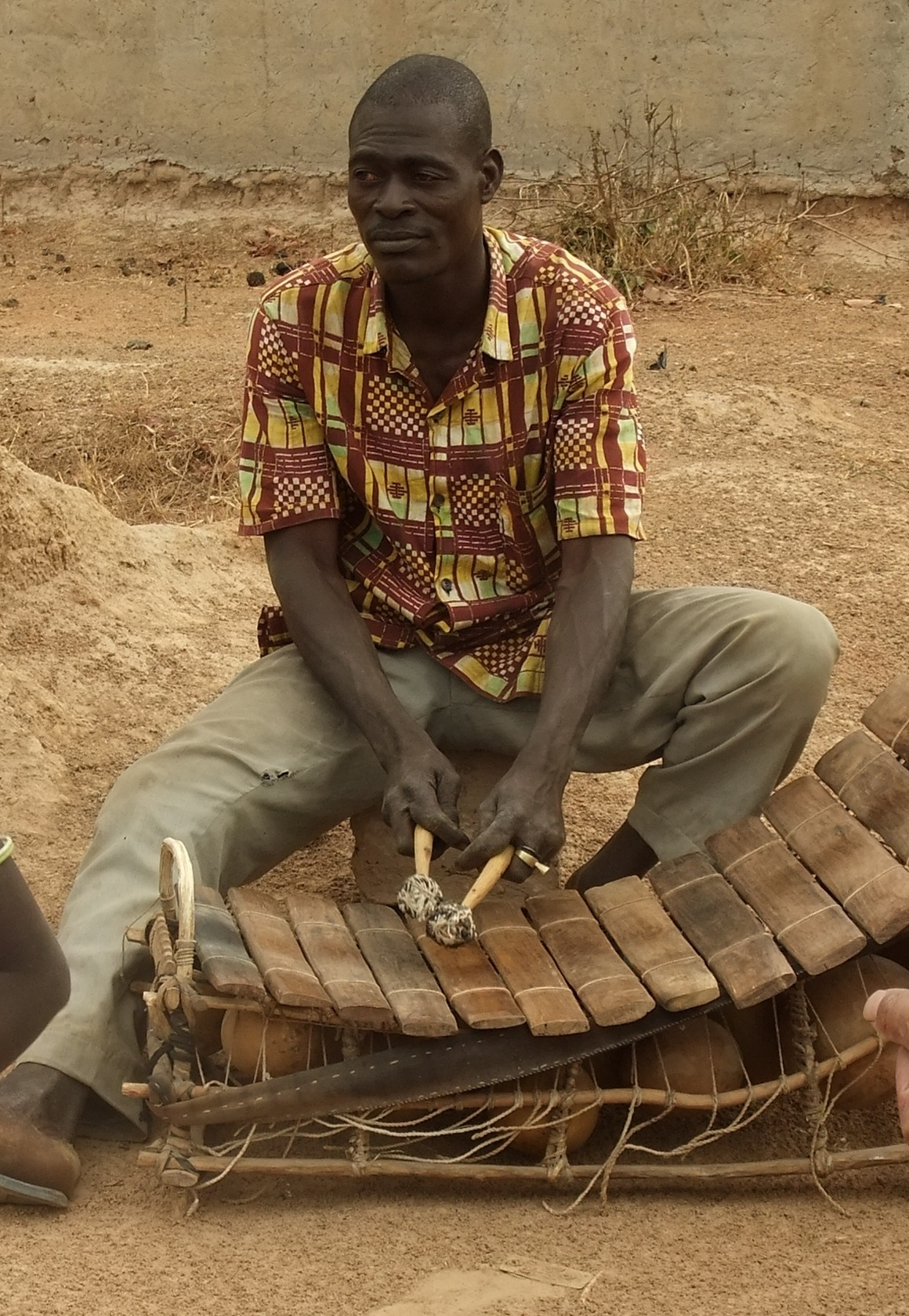
Balafon griot

Perhaps the most famous repository of oral tradition is the west African griot (named differently in different languages). The griot is a hereditary position and exists in Dyula, Soninke, Fula, Hausa, Songhai, Wolof, Serer, and Mossi societies among many others, although more famously in Mandinka society. They constitute a caste and perform a range of roles, including as a historian or library, musician, poet, mediator of family and tribal disputes, spokesperson, and served in the king's court, not dissimilar from the European bard. They keep records of all births, death, and marriages through the generations of the village or family. When Sundiata Keita founded the Mali Empire, he was offered Balla Fasséké as his griot to advise him during his reign, giving rise to the Kouyate line of griots. Griots often accompany their telling of oral tradition with a musical instrument, as the Epic of Sundiata is accompanied by the balafon, or as the kora accompanies other traditions. In modern times, some griots and descendants of griots have dropped their historian role and focus on music, with many finding success, however many still maintain their traditional roles.

==== East Africa ====
Kenya safeguarded its oral tradition by ratifying the UNESCO Convention for the Safeguarding of the Intangible Cultural Heritage in October 2007.

=== Europe ===
==== Albania ====
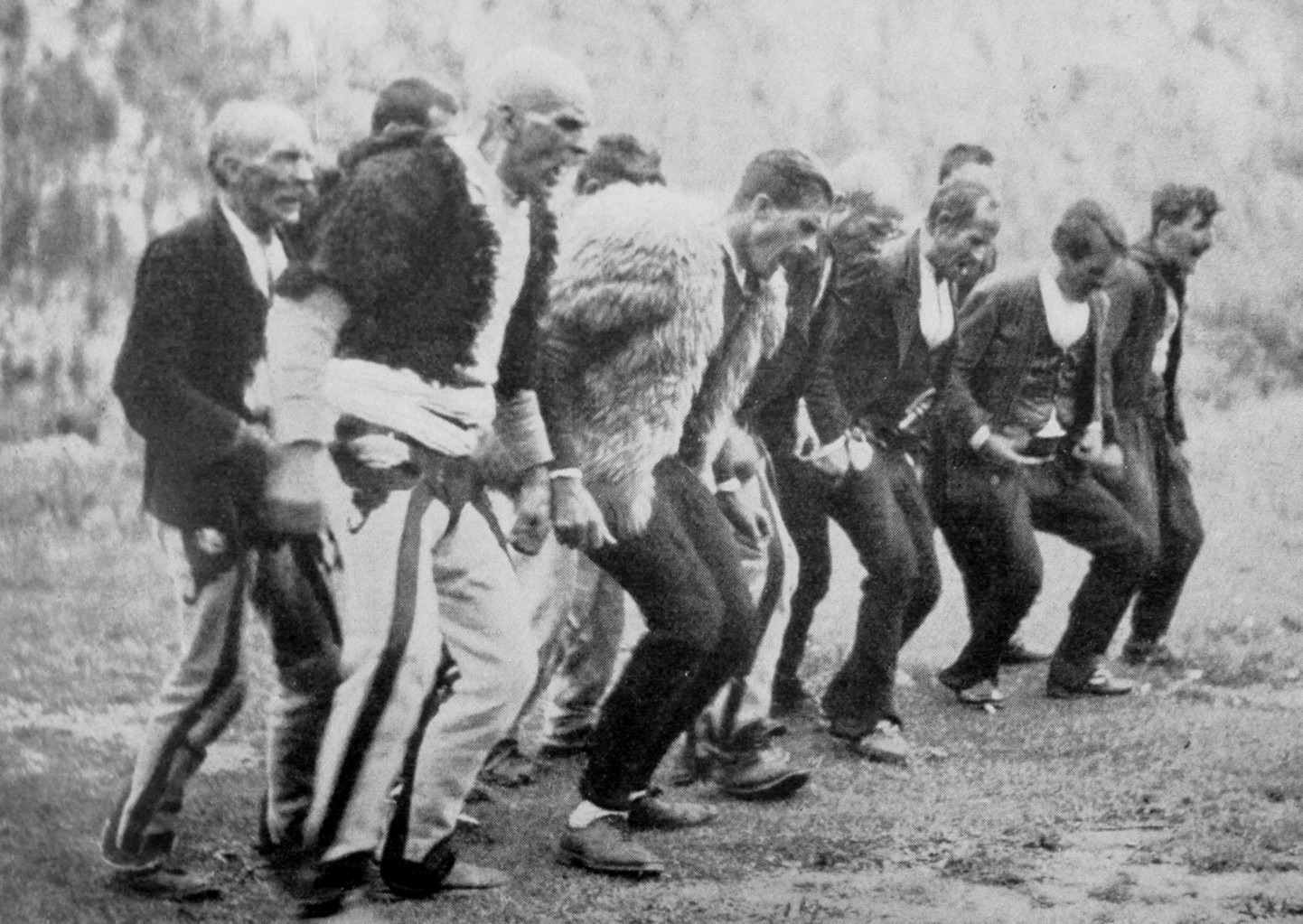
Men of Theth (Shala) practicing the gjâmë – the Albanian lamentation of the dead – in the funeral of Ujk Vuksani, 1937. The earliest figurative representations of this practice in traditional Albanian-inhabited regions appear on Dardanian funerary stelae of classical antiquity.

Albanian traditions have been handed down orally across generations. They have been preserved through traditional memory systems that have survived intact into modern times in Albania, a phenomenon that is explained by the lack of state formation among Albanians and their ancestors – the Illyrians, being able to preserve their "tribally" organized society. This distinguished them from civilizations such as Ancient Egypt, Minoans and Mycenaeans, who underwent state formation and disrupted their traditional memory practices.

Albanian epic poetry has been analysed by Homeric scholars to acquire a better understanding of Homeric epics. The long oral tradition that has sustained Albanian epic poetry reinforces the idea that pre-Homeric epic poetry was oral. The theory of oral-formulaic composition was developed also through the scholarly study of Albanian epic verse. The Albanian traditional singing of epic verse from memory is one of the last survivors of its kind in modern Europe, and the last survivor of the Balkan traditions.

==== Ancient Greece ====
"All ancient Greek literature", states Steve Reece, "was to some degree oral in nature, and the earliest literature was completely so". Homer's epic poetry, states Michael Gagarin, "was largely composed, performed and transmitted orally". As folklores and legends were performed in front of distant audiences, the singers would substitute the names in the stories with local characters or rulers to give the stories a local flavor and thus connect with the audience, but making the historicity embedded in the oral tradition unreliable. The lack of surviving texts about the Greek and Roman religious traditions have led scholars to presume that these were ritualistic and transmitted as oral traditions, but some scholars disagree that the complex rituals in the ancient Greek and Roman civilizations were an exclusive product of an oral tradition.

==== Ireland ====
An Irish seanchaí (plural: seanchaithe), meaning bearer of "old lore", was a traditional Irish language storyteller (the Scottish Gaelic equivalent being the seanchaidh, anglicised as shanachie). The job of a seanchaí was to serve the head of a lineage by passing information orally from one generation to the next about Irish folklore and history, particularly in medieval times.

==== Rome ====
The potential for oral transmission of history in ancient Rome is evidenced primarily by Cicero, who discusses the significance of oral tradition in works such as Brutus, Tusculan Disputations, and On The Orator. While Cicero's reliance on Cato's Origines may limit the breadth of his argument, he nonetheless highlights the importance of storytelling in preserving Roman history. Valerius Maximus also references oral tradition in Memorable Doings and Sayings (2.1.10).

Peter Wiseman argues that celebratory performances served as a vital medium for transmitting Roman history and that such traditions evolved into written forms by the third century CE. He asserts that the history of figures like the house of Tarquin was likely passed down through oral storytelling for centuries before being recorded in literature. Although Flower critiques the lack of ancient evidence supporting Wiseman's broader claims, Wiseman maintains that dramatic narratives fundamentally shaped historiography.

=== Asia ===
In Asia, the transmission of folklore, mythologies as well as scriptures in ancient India, in different Indian religions, was by oral tradition, preserved with precision with the help of elaborate mnemonic techniques:

According to Jack Goody, the Vedic texts likely involved both a written and oral tradition, calling it a "parallel products of a literate society". Mostly recently, research shows that oral performance of (written) texts could have been a philosophical activity in early China.

The early Buddhist texts are also generally believed to be of oral tradition, with the first by comparing inconsistencies in the transmitted versions of literature from various oral societies such as the Greek, Serbia and other cultures, then noting that the Vedic literature is too consistent and vast to have been composed and transmitted orally across generations, without being written down.

==== Middle East ====
In the Middle East, Arabic oral tradition has significantly influenced literary and cultural practices. Arabic oral tradition encompassed various forms of expression, including metrical poetry, unrhymed prose, rhymed prose (saj'), and prosimetrum—a combination of prose and poetry often employed in historical narratives. Poetry held a position of particular importance, as it was believed to be a more reliable medium for information transmission than prose. This belief stemmed from observations that highly structured language, with its rhythmic and phonetic patterns, tended to undergo fewer alterations during oral transmission.

Each genre of rhymed poetry served distinct social and cultural functions. These range from spontaneous compositions at celebrations to carefully crafted historical accounts, political commentaries, and entertainment pieces. Among these, the folk epics known as siyar (singular: sīra) were considered the most intricate. These prosimetric narratives, combining prose and verse, emerged in the early Middle Ages. While many such epics circulated historically, only one has survived as a sung oral poetic tradition: Sīrat Banī Hilāl. This epic recounts the westward migration and conquests of the Banu Hilal Bedouin tribe from the 10th to 12th centuries, culminating in their rule over parts of North Africa before their eventual defeat. The historical roots of Sīrat Banī Hilāl are evident in the present-day distribution of groups claiming descent from the tribe across North Africa and parts of the Middle East. The epic's development into a cohesive narrative was first documented by the historian Ibn Khaldūn in the 14th century. In his writings, Ibn Khaldūn describes collecting stories and poems from nomadic Arabs, using these oral sources to discuss the merits of colloquial versus classical poetry and the value of oral histories in written historical works.

The Torah and other ancient Jewish literature, the Judeo-Christian Bible and texts of early centuries of Christianity are rooted in an oral tradition, and the term "People of the Book" is a medieval construct. This is evidenced, for example, by the multiple scriptural statements by Paul admitting "previously remembered tradition which he received" orally.

The sacred texts of the Yazidis, who speak Kurmanji, have been transmitted chiefly by oral means. Yazidism has no single written scripture, and its most authoritative texts are hymns called Qewls, which trained reciters learn by memory, stanza by stanza and word for word, without notes. In Yazidi tradition each qewl is a fixed text, and reciters are expected to repeat it exactly as they were taught. Some Yazidi clergy families also kept handwritten copies, and the qewls were first printed in Baghdad in 1979.

=== Oceania ===
==== Polynesia ====
In many parts of island Polynesia there is a lively representation of the past withi oral traditions that is usually not available to those who cannot speak the relevant language.

==== Australia ====
Australian Aboriginal culture has thrived on oral traditions and oral histories passed down through thousands of years. In a study published in February 2020, new evidence showed that both Budj Bim and Tower Hill volcanoes erupted between 34,000 and 40,000 years ago. Significantly, this is a "minimum age constraint for human presence in Victoria", and also could be interpreted as evidence for the oral histories of the Gunditjmara people, an Aboriginal Australian people of south-western Victoria, which tell of volcanic eruptions being some of the oldest oral traditions in existence. A basalt stone axe found underneath volcanic ash in 1947 had already proven that humans inhabited the region before the eruption of Tower Hill.

=== Americas ===
==== Native American ====
Native American society was always reliant upon oral tradition, if not storytelling, in order to convey knowledge, morals and traditions amongst others, a trait Western settlers deemed as representing an inferior race with neither culture nor history, often cited as a reason behind indoctrination.

Writing systems are not known to exist among Native North Americans before contact with Europeans except among some Mesoamerican cultures, and possibly the South American quipu and North American wampum, although those two are debatable. Oral storytelling traditions flourished in a context without the use of writing to record and preserve history, scientific knowledge, and social practices. While some stories were told for amusement and leisure, most functioned as practical lessons from tribal experience applied to immediate moral, social, psychological, and environmental issues. Stories fuse fictional, supernatural, or otherwise exaggerated characters and circumstances with real emotions and morals as a means of teaching. Plots often reflect real life situations and may be aimed at particular people known by the story's audience. In this way, social pressure could be exerted without directly causing embarrassment or social exclusion. For example, rather than yelling, Inuit parents might deter their children from wandering too close to the water's edge by telling a story about a sea monster with a pouch for children within its reach. One single story could provide dozens of lessons. Stories were also used as a means to assess whether traditional cultural ideas and practices are effective in tackling contemporary circumstances or if they should be revised.

Native American storytelling is a collaborative experience between storyteller and listeners. Native American tribes generally have not had professional tribal storytellers marked by social status. Stories could and can be told by anyone, with each storyteller using their own vocal inflections, word choice, content, or form. Storytellers not only draw upon their own memories, but also upon a collective or tribal memory extending beyond personal experience but nevertheless representing a shared reality. Native languages have in some cases up to twenty words to describe physical features like rain or snow and can describe the spectra of human emotion in very precise ways, allowing storytellers to offer their own personalized take on a story based on their own lived experiences. Fluidity in story deliverance allowed stories to be applied to different social circumstances according to the storyteller's objective at the time. One's rendition of a story was often considered a response to another's rendition, with plot alterations suggesting alternative ways of applying traditional ideas to present conditions.

Listeners might have heard the story told many times, or even may have told the same story themselves. This does not take away from a story's meaning, as curiosity about what happens next was less of a priority than hearing fresh perspectives on well-known themes and plots. Elder storytellers generally were not concerned with discrepancies between their version of historical events and neighboring tribes' version of similar events, such as in origin stories. Tribal stories are considered valid within the tribe's own frame of reference and tribal experience. The 19th century Oglala Lakota tribal member Four Guns was known for his justification of the oral tradition and criticism of the written word.

Stories are used to preserve and transmit both tribal history and environmental history, which are often closely linked. Native oral traditions in the Pacific Northwest, for example, describe natural disasters like earthquakes and tsunamis. Various cultures from Vancouver Island and Washington have stories describing a physical struggle between a Thunderbird and a Whale. One such story tells of the Thunderbird, which can create thunder by moving just a feather, piercing the Whale's flesh with its talons, causing the Whale to dive to the bottom of the ocean, bringing the Thunderbird with it. Another depicts the Thunderbird lifting the Whale from the Earth then dropping it back down. Regional similarities in themes and characters suggests that these stories mutually describe the lived experience of earthquakes and floods within tribal memory. According to one story from the Suquamish Tribe, Agate Pass was created when an earthquake expanded the channel as a result of an underwater battle between a serpent and bird. Other stories in the region depict the formation of glacial valleys and moraines and the occurrence of landslides, with stories being used in at least one case to identify and date earthquakes that occurred in 900 CE and 1700.

Further examples include Arikara origin stories of emergence from an "underworld" of persistent darkness, which may represent the remembrance of life in the Arctic Circle during the last ice age, and stories involving a "deep crevice", which may refer to the Grand Canyon. Despite such examples of agreement between geological and archeological records on one hand and Native oral records on the other, some scholars have cautioned against the historical validity of oral traditions because of their susceptibility to detail alteration over time and lack of precise dates. The Native American Graves Protection and Repatriation Act considers oral traditions as a viable source of evidence for establishing the affiliation between cultural objects and Native Nations.

== Transmission ==
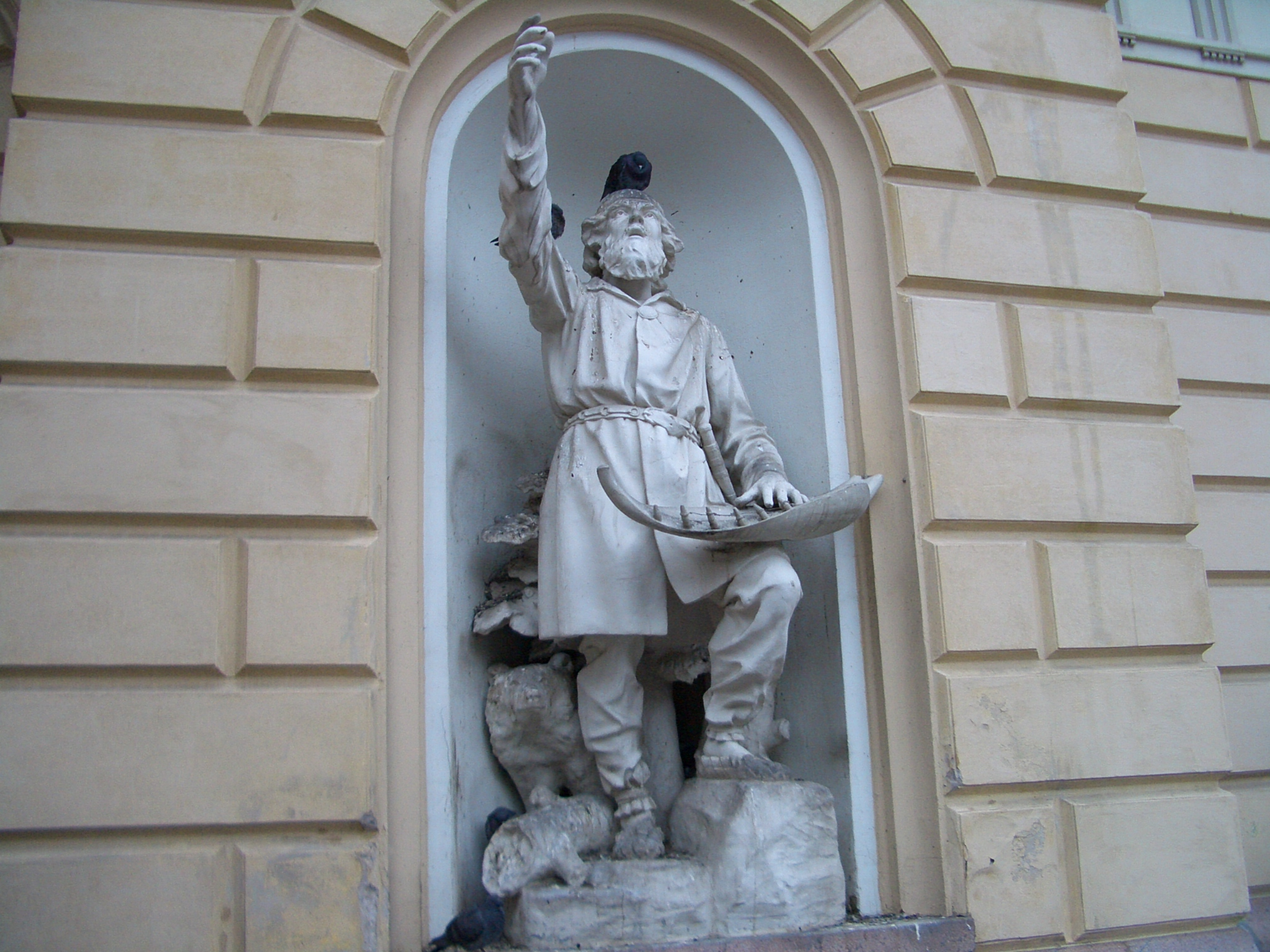
The legendary Finnish storyteller Väinämöinen with his kantele

Oral traditions face the challenge of accurate transmission and verifiability of the accurate version, particularly when the culture lacks written language or has limited access to writing tools. Oral cultures have employed various strategies that achieve this without writing. For example, a heavily rhythmic speech filled with mnemonic devices enhances memory and recall. A few useful mnemonic devices include alliteration, repetition, assonance, and proverbial sayings. In addition, the verse is often metrically composed with an exact number of syllables or morae—such as with Greek and Latin prosody and in Chandas found in Hindu and Buddhist texts.

The verses of the epic or text are typically designed wherein the long and short syllables are repeated by certain rules, so that if an error or inadvertent change is made, an internal examination of the verse reveals the problem. Oral traditions can be passed on through plays and acting, as shown in modern-day Cameroon by the Graffis or Grasslanders who perform and deliver speeches to teach their history through oral tradition. Such strategies facilitate transmission of information without a written intermediate, and they can also be applied to oral governance.

=== Oral transmission of law ===
The law itself in oral cultures is enshrined in formulaic sayings, proverbs, which are not mere jurisprudential decorations, but themselves constitute the law. A judge in an oral culture is often called on to articulate sets of relevant proverbs out of which he can make equitable decisions in the cases under formal litigation before him.

Rudyard Kipling's The Jungle Book provides an excellent demonstration of oral governance in the Law of the Jungle. Not only does grounding rules in oral proverbs allow for simple transmission and understanding, but it also legitimizes new rulings by allowing extrapolation. These stories, traditions, and proverbs are not static, but are often altered upon each transmission, barring any change to the overall meaning. In this way, the rules that govern the people are modified by the whole and not authored by a single entity.

=== Indian religions ===
Ancient texts of Hinduism, Buddhism and Jainism were preserved and transmitted by an oral tradition. For example, the śrutis of Hinduism called the Vedas, the oldest of which trace back to the second millennium BCE. Michael Witzel explains this oral tradition as follows:

The Vedic texts were orally composed and transmitted, without the use of script, in an unbroken line of transmission from teacher to student that was formalized early on. This ensured an impeccable textual transmission superior to the classical texts of other cultures; it is, in fact, something like a tape-recording... Not just the actual words, but even the long-lost musical (tonal) accent (as in old Greek or in Japanese) has been preserved up to the present.

— Michael Witzel

Ancient Indians developed techniques for listening, memorization and recitation of their knowledge, in schools called Gurukul, while maintaining exceptional accuracy of their knowledge across the generations. Many forms of recitation or pathas were designed to aid accuracy in recitation and the transmission of the Vedas and other knowledge texts from one generation to the next. All hymns in each Veda were recited in this way; for example, all 1,028 hymns with 10,600 verses of the Rigveda was preserved in this way; as were all other Vedas including the Principal Upanishads, as well as the Vedangas. Each text was recited in a number of ways, to ensure that the different methods of recitation acted as a cross check on the other. Pierre-Sylvain Filliozat summarizes this as:

- Samhita-patha: continuous recitation of Sanskrit words bound by the phonetic rules of euphonic combination;
- Pada-patha: a recitation marked by a conscious pause after every word, and after any special grammatical codes embedded inside the text; this method suppresses euphonic combination and restores each word in its original intended form;
- Krama-patha: a step-by-step recitation where euphonically combined words are paired successively and sequentially and then recited; for example, a hymn "word1 word2 word3 word4...", would be recited as "word1word2 word2word3 word3word4 ...."; this method to verify accuracy is credited to Vedic sages Gargya and Sakalya in the Hindu tradition and mentioned by the ancient Sanskrit grammarian Panini (dated to pre-Buddhism period);
- Krama-patha modified: the same step-by-step recitation as above, but without euphonic-combinations (or free form of each word); this method to verify accuracy is credited to Vedic sages Babhravya and Galava in the Hindu tradition, and is also mentioned by the ancient Sanskrit grammarian Panini;
- Jata-pāṭha, dhvaja-pāṭha and ghana-pāṭha are methods of recitation of a text and its oral transmission that developed after 5th century BCE, that is after the start of Buddhism and Jainism; these methods use more complicated rules of combination and were less used.

These extraordinary retention techniques guaranteed an accurate Śruti, fixed across the generations, not just in terms of unaltered word order but also in terms of sound. That these methods have been effective, is testified to by the preservation of the most ancient Indian religious text, the Ṛgveda (c. 1500 BCE).

=== Poetry of Homer ===
Research by Milman Parry and Albert Lord indicates that the verse of the Greek poet Homer has been passed down not by rote memorization but by "oral-formulaic composition". In this process, extempore composition is aided by use of stock phrases or "formulas" (expressions that are used regularly "under the same metrical conditions, to express a particular essential idea"). In the case of the work of Homer, formulas included eos rhododaktylos ("rosy fingered dawn") and oinops pontos ("winedark sea") which fit in a modular fashion into the poetic form (in this case six-colon Greek hexameter). Since the development of this theory, of oral-formulaic composition has been "found in many different time periods and many different cultures", and according to another source (John Miles Foley) "touch[ed] on" over 100 "ancient, medieval and modern traditions".

=== Islam ===
The most recent of the world's major religions, Islam claims two major sources of divine revelation—the Quran and hadith—compiled in written form relatively shortly after being revealed:

- The Quran—meaning "recitation" in Arabic—is believed by Muslims to be God's revelation to the Islamic prophet Muhammad, delivered to him from 610 CE until his death in 632 CE. It is said to have been carefully compiled and edited into a standardized written form (known as the mushaf) (Note: "During Abu Bakr's khalifate, at Omar's suggestion, all the pieces of the Qur'an were compiled in one place. It was a miscellaneous collection at first, because then the revelations were coming in, people recorded them on anything that came to hand -- a sheet of parchment, a piece of leather, a stone, a bone, whatever. As khalifa, Omar began a sorting process. In his presence, each written verse was checked against the memorized version kept by the professional reciters whom this society regarded as the most reliable keepers of information. Scribes then recorded the authorized copy of each verse before witnesses, and these verse were organized into one comprehensive collection.") about two decades after the last verse was revealed.
- Hadith—meaning "narrative" or "report" in Arabic—is the record of the words, actions, and the silent approval, of Muhammad, and was transmitted by "oral preachers and storytellers" for around 150–250 years. Each hadith includes the isnad (chain of human transmitters who passed down the tradition before it was sorted according to accuracy, compiled, and committed to written form by a reputable scholar. (Note: Muhammad is thought to have died in 632 CE. The compilers of the six collections of Sunni hadith that have enjoyed near-universal acceptance as part of the official canon of Sunni Islam died (that is, must have stopped compiling hadith) between 795 CE and 915 CE.)

The oral milieu in which the sources were revealed, and their oral form in general are important. The Arab poetry that preceded the Quran and the hadith were orally transmitted. Few Arabs were literate at the time and paper was not available in the Middle East.

The written Quran is said to have been created in part through memorization by Muhammad's companions, and the decision to create a standard written work is said to have come after the death in battle (Yamama) of a large number of Muslims who had memorized the work.

For centuries, copies of the Qurans were transcribed by hand, not printed, and their scarcity and expense made reciting the Quran from memory, not reading, the predominant mode of teaching it to others. To this day the Quran is memorized by millions and its recitation can be heard throughout the Muslim world from recordings and mosque loudspeakers (during Ramadan). Muslims state that some who teach memorization/recitation of the Quran constitute the end of an "un-broken chain" whose original teacher was Muhammad himself. It has been argued that "the Qur'an's rhythmic style and eloquent expression make it easy to memorize," and was made so to facilitate the "preservation and remembrance" of the work.

Islamic doctrine holds that from the time it was revealed to the present day, the Quran has not been altered, (Note: An alternative belief is that some of what was revealed to Muhammad was later abrogated in some way by God. "The mushaf is incomplete, in the sense that not everything that was once revealed to Muhammad is to be found today in our mushaf. The Quran, however, is complete, in the sense that everything that God intends us to find in the mushaf we shall find there, for whatever God intended to include, He made sure to preserve...") its continuity from divine revelation to its current written form ensured by the large numbers of Muhammad's supporters who had reverently memorized the work, a careful compiling process and divine intervention. (Muslim scholars agree that although scholars have worked hard to separate the corrupt and uncorrupted hadith, this other source of revelation is not nearly so free of corruption because of the hadith's great political and theological influence.)

At least two non-Muslim scholars (Alan Dundes and Andrew G. Bannister) have examined the possibility that the Quran was not just "recited orally, but actually composed orally". Bannister postulates that some parts of the Quran—such as the seven re-tellings of the story of the Iblis and Adam, and the repeated phrases "which of the favours of your Lord will you deny?" in sura 55—make more sense addressed to listeners than readers.

Banister, Dundes and other scholars (Shabbir Akhtar, Angelika Neuwirth, Islam Dayeh) have also noted the large amount of "formulaic" phraseology in the Quran consistent with "oral-formulaic composition" mentioned above. The most common formulas are the attributes of Allah—all-mighty, all-wise, all-knowing, all-high, etc.—often found as doublets at the end of a verse. Among the other repeated phrases (Note: Dundes lists of repeated phrases come from an English translation and so those Quranic phrases in the original Arabic sometimes have slight differences) are "Allah created the heavens and the earth" (found 19 times in the Quran).

As much as one third of the Quran is made up of "oral formulas", according to Dundes' estimates. Bannister, using a computer database of (the original Arabic) words of the Quran and of their "grammatical role, root, number, person, gender and so forth", estimates that depending on the length of the phrase searched, somewhere between 52% (three word phrases) and 23% (five word phrases) are oral formulas. Dundes reckons his estimates confirm "that the Quran was orally transmitted from its very beginnings". Bannister believes his estimates "provide strong corroborative evidence that oral composition should be seriously considered as we reflect upon how the Qur'anic text was generated."

Dundes argues oral-formulaic composition is consistent with "the cultural context of Arabic oral tradition", quoting researchers who have found poetry reciters in the Najd (the region next to where the Quran was revealed) using "a common store of themes, motives, stock images, phraseology and prosodical options", and "a discursive and loosely structured" style "with no fixed beginning or end" and "no established sequence in which the episodes must follow". (Note: Scholar Saad Sowayan referring to the genre of "Saudi Arabian historical oral narrative genre called suwalif".)

=== Catholicism ===
The Catholic Church upholds that its teaching contained in its deposit of faith is transmitted not only through scripture, but as well as through sacred tradition. The Second Vatican Council affirmed in Dei verbum that the teachings of Jesus Christ were initially passed on to early Christians by "the Apostles who, by their oral preaching, by example, and by observance handed on what they had received from the lips of Christ, from living with Him, and from what He did". The Catholic Church asserts that this mode of transmission of the faith persists through current-day bishops, who by right of apostolic succession, have continued the oral passing of what had been revealed through Christ through their preaching as teachers.

=== Eastern Orthodoxy ===
In Eastern Orthodoxy, there is one Tradition, the tradition of the church, incorporating the scriptures and the teaching of the Church Fathers.

Sacred Tradition for the Eastern Orthodox is the deposit of faith given by Jesus to the Apostles and passed on in the Church from one generation to the next without addition, alteration, or subtraction.

== Music ==
Music is a way for people to transmit songs, melodies and musical practices across different generations. For example, the role of oral traditions in music related to the mugham, raga and gagaku has been passed on through historical records of music-making.

=== Transmission and learning ===
==== Hindustani ====
Hindustani music passes through transmission through processes where the instructor teaches their student without the aid of writing or notation. The teachings of Hindustani music are bound with the principle of Guru-shishya parampara, where a living teacher transmits information to their student using the ears and mouth. The literal translation of Guru-shishya parampara is "the tradition of teacher and student". The Indian-origin religions believed that Guru-shishya provided benefits that musical notation did not possess, such as timing, tuning, tone and presence. This meant that timing could be felt in a more sentimental and attached way, rather than physically counting the beats in. Letting the student 'feel' the beat themselves creates attachment between the student and the instrument, which enhanced performance capability. A skilled tabla player would be able to feel the innate beat without an external assistance, according to ancient Indian beliefs. The classical tabla tradition was started by the same Guru-shishya ideology, where mostly illiterate musicians did not write things down, but rather communicated through oral traditions.

==== Ethiopian Tewahedo ====
In Ethiopia, the same oral tradition transmission can be witnessed as with some parts of Medieval Europe. In local ecclesiastical schools, music and literature are often taught within the same subject to integrate the oral transmission into musical studies. Singers memorise musical pieces by reciting chants that model whole melodies and melodies that are conventionally expressed through notation. More generally, in West Africa the first musical lessons were taught by the child's mother, where the child was placed on their mother's back whilst she continued with her daily tasks. Children were taught to conform and adhere to social etiquette through these songs, whilst also bringing them a sense of pitch from a young age. Parents would orally insist on practicing clapping and singing, oftentimes during the evening, until it was flawless. When children reached the teenage years, they often joined child-operated bands, which encouraged children to play instruments and develop a love for music. Because of the lack of resources, children improvised by resorting to natural resources, such as stretching bladders across a second-hand used tin for drums.

== Study ==
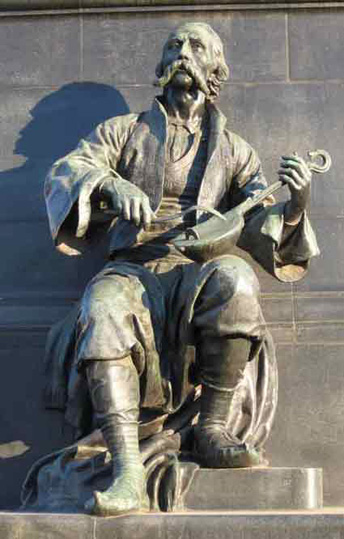
Filip Višnjić (1767–1834), Serbian blind guslar

In the work of the Serb scholar Vuk Stefanović Karadžić (1787–1864), a contemporary and friend of the Brothers Grimm. Vuk pursued similar projects of "salvage folklore" (similar to rescue archaeology) in the cognate traditions of the South Slavic regions which would later be gathered into Yugoslavia, and with the same admixture of romantic and nationalistic interests (he considered all those speaking the Eastern Herzegovinian dialect as Serbs). Somewhat later, but as part of the same scholarly enterprise of nationalist studies in folklore, the turcologist Vasily Radlov (1837–1918) would study the songs of the Kara-Kirghiz in what would later become the Soviet Union; Karadzic and Radloff would provide models for the work of Parry.

=== Walter Ong ===
In a separate development, the media theorist Marshall McLuhan (1911–1980) would begin to focus attention on the ways that communicative media shape the nature of the content conveyed. He would serve as mentor to the Jesuit Walter Ong (1912–2003), whose interests in cultural history, psychology and rhetoric would result in Orality and Literacy (Methuen, 1980) and the important but less-known Fighting for Life: Contest, Sexuality and Consciousness (Cornell, 1981). These two works articulated the contrasts between cultures defined by primary orality, writing, print, and the secondary orality of the electronic age.

I style the orality of a culture totally untouched by any knowledge of writing or print, 'primary orality'. It is 'primary' by contrast with the 'secondary orality' of present-day high technology culture, in which a new orality is sustained by telephone, radio, television and other electronic devices that depend for their existence and functioning on writing and print. Today primary culture in the strict sense hardly exists, since every culture knows of writing and has some experience of its effects. Still, to varying degrees many cultures and sub-cultures, even in a high-technology ambiance, preserve much of the mind-set of primary orality.

Ong's works also made possible an integrated theory of oral tradition which accounted for both production of content (the chief concern of Parry-Lord theory) and its reception. This approach, like McLuhan's, kept the field open not just to the study of aesthetic culture but to the way physical and behavioral artifacts of oral societies are used to store, manage and transmit knowledge, so that oral tradition provides methods for investigation of cultural differences, other than the purely verbal, between oral and literate societies.

The most-often studied section of Orality and Literacy concerns the "psychodynamics of orality" This chapter seeks to define the fundamental characteristics of 'primary' orality and summarizes a series of descriptors (including but not limited to verbal aspects of culture) which might be used to index the relative orality or literacy of a given text or society.

=== John Miles Foley ===
In advance of Ong's synthesis, John Miles Foley began a series of papers based on his own fieldwork on South Slavic oral genres, emphasizing the dynamics of performers and audiences. Foley effectively consolidated oral tradition as an academic field when he compiled Oral-Formulaic Theory and Research in 1985. The bibliography gives a summary of the progress scholars made in evaluating the oral tradition up to that point, and includes a list of all relevant scholarly articles relating to the theory of Oral-Formulaic Composition. He also both established both the journal Oral Tradition and founded the Center for Studies in Oral Tradition (1986) at the University of Missouri. Foley developed Oral Theory beyond the somewhat mechanistic notions presented in earlier versions of Oral-Formulaic Theory, by extending Ong's interest in cultural features of oral societies beyond the verbal, by drawing attention to the agency of the bard and by describing how oral traditions bear meaning.

The bibliography would establish a clear underlying methodology which accounted for the findings of scholars working in the separate Linguistics fields (primarily Ancient Greek, Anglo-Saxon and Serbo-Croatian). Perhaps more importantly, it would stimulate conversation among these specialties, so that a network of independent but allied investigations and investigators could be established.

Foley's key works include The Theory of Oral Composition (1988); Immanent Art (1991); Traditional Oral Epic: The Odyssey, Beowulf and the Serbo-Croatian Return-Song (1993); The Singer of Tales in Performance (1995); Teaching Oral Traditions (1998); How to Read an Oral Poem (2002). His Pathways Project (2005–2012) draws parallels between the media dynamics of oral traditions and the Internet.

=== Acceptance and further elaboration ===
The theory of oral tradition would undergo elaboration and development as it grew in acceptance. While the number of formulas documented for various traditions proliferated, the concept of the formula remained lexically bound. However, numerous innovations appeared, such as the "formulaic system" (Note: Donald K. Fry responds to what was known, pejoratively, in Greek studies as the "hard Parryist" position, in which the formula was defined in terms of verbatim lexical repetition (see Rosenmyer, Thomas G. "The Formula in Early Greek Poetry" Arion 4 (1965):295-311). Fry's model proposes underlying generative templates which provide for variation and even artistic creativity within the constraints of strict metrical requirements and extempore composition-in-performance) with structural "substitution slots" for syntactic, morphological and narrative necessity (as well as for artistic invention). Sophisticated models such as Foley's "word-type placement rules" followed. Higher levels of formulaic composition were defined over the years, such as "ring composition", "responsion" and the "type-scene" (also called a "theme" or "typical scene"). Examples include the "Beasts of Battle" and the "Cliffs of Death". Some of these characteristic patterns of narrative details, (like "the arming sequence;" "the hero on the beach"; "the traveler recognizes his goal") would show evidence of global distribution.

At the same time, the fairly rigid division between oral and literate was replaced by recognition of transitional and compartmentalized texts and societies, including models of diglossia (Brian Stock Franz Bäuml, and Eric Havelock). Perhaps most importantly, the terms and concepts of "orality" and "literacy" came to be replaced with the more useful and apt "traditionality" and "textuality". Very large units would be defined (The Indo-European Return Song) and areas outside of military epic would come under investigation: women's song, riddles and other genres.

The methodology of oral tradition now conditions a variety of studies, not only in folklore, literature and literacy, but in philosophy, communication theory, Semiotics, and including a broad and expanding variety of languages and ethnic groups, and perhaps most conspicuously in biblical studies, in which Werner Kelber has been especially prominent. The annual bibliography is indexed by 100 areas, most of which are ethnolinguistic divisions.

Present developments explore the implications of the theory for rhetoric and composition, interpersonal communication, cross-cultural communication, postcolonial studies, rural community development, popular culture and film studies and many other areas. The most significant areas of theoretical development at present may be the construction of systematic hermeneutics and aesthetics

=== Criticism ===
The theory of oral tradition encountered early resistance from scholars who perceived it as potentially supporting either one side or another in the controversy between what were known as "unitarians" and "analysts"—that is, scholars who believed Homer to have been a single, historical figure, and those who saw him as a conceptual "author function", a convenient name to assign to what was essentially a repertoire of traditional narrative. A much more general dismissal of the theory and its implications simply described it as "unprovable" Some scholars, mainly outside the field of oral tradition, represent (either dismissively or with approval) this body of theoretical work as reducing the great epics to children's party games like "telephone" or "Chinese whispers". While games provide amusement by showing how messages distort content via uncontextualized transmission, Parry's supporters argue that the theory of oral tradition reveals how oral methods optimized the signal-to-noise ratio and thus improved the quality, stability and integrity of content transmission.

There were disputes concerning particular findings of the theory. For example, those trying to support or refute Crowne's hypothesis found the "Hero on the Beach" formula in numerous Old English poems. Similarly, it was also discovered in other works of Germanic origin, Middle English poetry, and even an Icelandic prose saga. J.A. Dane, in an article characterized as "polemics without rigor" claimed that the appearance of the theme in Ancient Greek poetry, a tradition without known connection to the Germanic, invalidated the notion of "an autonomous theme in the baggage of an oral poet".

Within Homeric studies specifically, Lord's The Singer of Tales, which focused on problems and questions that arise in conjunction with applying oral-formulaic theory to problematic texts such as the Iliad, Odyssey, and even Beowulf, influenced nearly all of the articles written on Homer and oral-formulaic composition thereafter. However, in response to Lord, Geoffrey Kirk published The Songs of Homer, questioning Lord's extension of the oral-formulaic nature of Serbian and Croatian literature (the area from which the theory was first developed) to Homeric epic. Kirk argues that Homeric poems differ from those traditions in their "metrical strictness", "formular system[s]", and creativity. In other words, Kirk argued that Homeric poems were recited under a system that gave the reciter much more freedom to choose words and passages to get to the same end than the Serbo-Croatian poet, who was merely "reproductive". Shortly thereafter, Eric Havelock's Preface to Plato revolutionized how scholars looked at Homeric epic by arguing not only that it was the product of an oral tradition, but also that the oral-formulas contained therein served as a way for ancient Greeks to preserve cultural knowledge across many different generations. Adam Parry, in his 1966 work "Have we Homer's Iliad?", theorized the existence of the most fully developed oral poet to his time, a person who could (at his discretion) creatively and intellectually create nuanced characters in the context of the accepted, traditional story. In fact, he discounted the Serbo-Croatian tradition to an "unfortunate" extent, choosing to elevate the Greek model of oral-tradition above all others. Lord reacted to Kirk's and Parry's essays with "Homer as Oral Poet", published in 1968, which reaffirmed Lord's belief in the relevance of Yugoslav poetry and its similarities to Homer and downplayed the intellectual and literary role of the reciters of Homeric epic.

Many of the criticisms of the theory have been absorbed into the evolving field as useful refinements and modifications. For example, in what Foley called a "pivotal" contribution, Larry Benson introduced the concept of "written-formulaic" to describe the status of some Anglo-Saxon poetry which, while demonstrably written, contains evidence of oral influences, including heavy reliance on formulas and themes A number of individual scholars in many areas continue to have misgivings about the applicability of the theory or the aptness of the South Slavic comparison, and particularly what they regard as its implications for the creativity which may legitimately be attributed to the individual artist. However, at present, there seems to be little systematic or theoretically coordinated challenge to the fundamental tenets of the theory; as Foley put it, ""there have been numerous suggestions for revisions or modifications of the theory, but the majority of controversies have generated further understanding.

== Historiography ==
The development of African historiography in the mid to late 20th century saw a movement towards utilising oral sources alongside auxiliary disciplines, due to the paucity of written sources. Oral traditions differ from written texts in that they are more directly subject to the sensory experience of the listener(s). In 1961, Jan Vansina published Oral tradition in which he made the case for the validity of oral sources as historical sources, and it is regarded as one of the most influential works written about African history and oral tradition. Oral traditions have been utilised in the reconstruction of various Indigenous peoples' histories, including Maori's, Native Americans', and Polynesians'.

Historians collect and transcribe oral traditions via fieldwork, a practice that was initially foreign to historians who would usually spend most of their time sifting through archives and libraries. (Note: Tapes are preferred over transcriptions as they include more information about the interviewee's attitudes, such as laughter, hesitations, disagreements etc.) Unfortunately, in Africa most of the early tapes and transcriptions weren't submitted to public depositories, gravely impacting verifiability and future critique of interpretation. Researchers tend not to be fluent in the local language, and employ interpreters to translate questions and answers, harming the communication of meanings and understanding. Individualised interviews tend to be preferred because in group performances, which consist of the narrator and audience sharing and shaping the story, improvisation to entertain may be prioritised over accuracy of the tale. Occasionally, traditions are influenced by written works or incorporate recently acquired information, called feedback. As oral tradition rarely incorporates chronological devices, lists of rulers have been crucial to establishing dates and chronologies. This is done via generational averaging, with the most common length chosen for generations being 27 years. In some cases, a ruler or event is mentioned in contemporary written sources of whose dates are known. Some lists have been known to grow over time, harming their credibility. Barbara Cooper emphasises the creativity of the oral poet, and criticises the formulaic approach saying that the meaning sits in the performance, not necessarily captured through analysis of a transcription or interpretation of the words. Karin Barber said that oral traditions enact struggles and power, not only of historical individuals but also of the oral poet in that the oral 'text' only exists for the speaker and listeners. Jan Bender Shetler wrote that oral historians "reconstruct (rather than reproduce) oral traditions through the use of mnemonic systems, the central elements of which scholars of oral tradition call core images or clichés", and that the core images are the key to historical interpretation.

There have been various academic debates in African historiography surrounding oral tradition. The first in the 1960s involved Jan Vansina and his students developing a rigorous approach to recover the past from oral traditions, counteracting scepticism and outright dismissal of the concept of African history. This was successful, despite not engaging and cooperating with African-American movements around oral history. The second focussed on the argument that oral traditions consisted of faithful memories of past events, which faced criticism from functionalists who argued that oral traditions function to reinforce present-day realities and give relatively little information about the past (called the "presentist critique"), and structuralists who emphasised the mythological and symbolic elements of oral tradition (called the "cosmological critique"). The cosmological critique was answered by Joseph Miller's The African Past Speaks (1980), in which historians emphasised the need to pay attention to how cultural understanding, political struggle, and memory shape traditions, and explore and analyse discrepancies between traditions which tend to signal problems, shifts, struggles, and loud silences. On the other hand, the presentist critique has proved pertinent and has been harder to dismiss. A folklorist critique of Africanist historians emphasised the role of the individual traditional oral historian in the crafting and preservation of oral traditions (and the possibility of infusion of autobiographical or experiential information, necessitating inquiry about the storyteller's life), rather than Africanists' focus on the influence of institutions, and the importance of an emic (insider) approach, rather than an etic (outsider) approach where the traditions are transcribed and interpreted from an outsider/European perspective.

== See also ==
- Category:Oral tradition
- Category:Oral literature
- Category:Folklore
- American Indian elder
- Folk process
- "Gawęda" (a genre of Polish oral folklore)
- Geomythology
- "Gold Duck" (Polish: "Złota Kaczka")
- Griot
- Hadith
- Intangible culture
- Oral history
- Oral law
- Oral Torah
- Oral Tradition Journal
- Oral-formulaic composition
- Orality
- Panchatantra
- Parampara
- Patha, Śrauta
- Secondary orality
- Traditional knowledge
- Understanding Media
- World Oral Literature Project
