= Walter J. Ong =

American Jesuit priest and historian (1912–2003)

Walter J. Ong

Walter Jackson Ong, S.J. (November 30, 1912 – August 12, 2003) was an American Jesuit priest, professor of English literature, cultural and religious historian, and philosopher. His major interest was in exploring how the transition from orality to literacy influenced culture and changed human consciousness. In 1978 he served as elected president of the Modern Language Association.

== Biography ==
Ong was born on November 30, 1912, in Kansas City, Missouri. His parents were Walter Jackson Ong and Blanche Eugenia Ong (née Mense). In 1929 he graduated from Rockhurst High School. In 1933 he received a Bachelor of Arts degree from Rockhurst College, where he majored in Latin. During his time at Rockhurst College, he founded a chapter of the Catholic fraternity Alpha Delta Gamma. He worked in printing and publishing prior to entering the Society of Jesus in 1935, and was ordained a Roman Catholic priest in 1946.

In 1940 Ong earned a master's degree in English at Saint Louis University. His thesis on sprung rhythm in the poetry of Gerard Manley Hopkins was supervised by the young Canadian Marshall McLuhan. Ong also received the degrees Licentiate of Philosophy and Licentiate of Sacred Theology from Saint Louis University.

After completing his dissertation on the French logician and educational reformer Peter Ramus (1515–1572) and Ramism under the supervision of Perry Miller at Harvard University in 1954, Ong returned to Saint Louis University, where he would teach for the next 30 years. In 1955 he received his PhD in English from Harvard University.

In 1963 the French government honored Ong for his work on Ramus by dubbing him a knight, Chevalier de l'Ordre des Palmes académiques. In 1966–1967 he served on the 14-member White House Task Force on Education that reported to President Lyndon Johnson. In 1971 Ong was elected a Fellow of the American Academy of Arts and Sciences. In 1974, he served as Lincoln Lecturer abroad for the Board of Foreign Scholarships. In 1967 he served as president of the Milton Society of America. In 1978 he served as elected president of the Modern Language Association of America. He was very active on the lecture circuit as well as in professional organizations.

Ong died in 2003 in St. Louis, Missouri.

== Summary of Ong's works and interests ==
A major concern of Ong's works is the impact that the shift from orality to literacy has had on culture and education. Writing is a technology like other technologies (fire, the steam engine, etc.) that, when introduced to a "primary oral culture" (which has never known writing) has extremely wide-ranging impacts in all areas of life. These include culture, economics, politics, art, and more. Furthermore, even a small amount of education in writing transforms people's mentality from the holistic immersion of orality to interiorization and individuation.

Many of the effects of the introduction of the technology of writing are related to the fact that oral cultures require strategies of preserving information in the absence of writing. These include, for example, a reliance on proverbs or condensed wisdom for making decisions, epic poetry, and stylized culture heroes (wise Nestor, crafty Odysseus). Writing makes these features no longer necessary, and introduces new strategies of remembering cultural material, which itself now changes.

Because cultures at any given time vary along a continuum between full orality and full literacy, Ong distinguishes between primary oral cultures (which have never known writing), cultures with craft literacy (such as scribes), and cultures in a transition phase from orality to literacy, in which some people know of writing but are illiterate - these cultures have "residual orality".

Some of Ong's interests:

1. the historical development of visualist tendencies in Western philosophic thought
2. the mathematical transformation of thought in medieval and early modern logic and beyond
3. oral cyclic thought, which is characteristic of primary oral cultures, versus linear or historical or evolutionary thought, which depends on writing
4. the movement from oral heroic poetry to mock-heroic poetry in print culture to the realist tradition in literature to the modern antihero
5. the historical development in manuscript culture and print culture of the inward turn of personalized ego-consciousness, or individuality
6. the new dimensions of orality fostered by modern communication media that accentuate sound, which Ong calls secondary orality as it succeeds from, relies on, and coexists with writing
7. the origins and development of the Western educational system
8. the role and effects of Learned Latin in Western culture

== Major works ==
=== Ramus, Method, and the Decay of Dialogue (1958) ===
According to Adrian Johns' foreword to the 2004 edition, Ong was urged to research Ramus after his graduate mentor, Marshall McLuhan, had no particular interest in Ong's original subject, Gerard Manley Hopkins. McLuhan vigorously encouraged Ong's work, and eventually drew upon his former student's perspective on Ramism to write his own pivotal work, The Gutenberg Galaxy.

Ramus, Method, and the Decay of Dialogue: From the Art of Discourse to the Art of Reason (1958) elaborates the contrast between the visual and the oral that Ong found in Louis Lavelle's La parole et l'ecriture (1942). Ong details how the spatialization and quantification of thought in dialectic and logic during the Middle Ages enabled "a new state of mind" to emerge in print culture, which is associated with the emergence of modern science.

The companion volume, Ramus and Talon Inventory (1958) is a notable work that contributes to the field known today as book history. Therein, Ong briefly describes more than 750 volumes (mostly in Latin) that he had tracked down in more than 100 libraries in Europe.

Peter Ramus (1515–1572), was a French humanist, logician, and educational reformer whose textbook method of analyzing subjects was very widely adopted in many academic fields. In "Ramist Classroom Procedure and the Nature of Reality", Ong discusses Ramism as a transition phase between the Classical style of education and the modern one. He writes, "...Ramism might seem merely quaint, perhaps artistically lethal, but of no great importance. Yet its great spread will hardly allow us to regard it as educationally insignificant. As a matter of fact, it has educational significance of the headiest sort, for it implies no less than that it is the "arts" or curriculum subjects which hold the world together. Nothing is accessible for "use," that is, for active intussusception (the assimilation of new material and its dispersal among preexistent matter) by the human being, until it has first been put through the curriculum. The schoolroom is by implication the doorway to reality, and indeed the only doorway."

=== The Presence of the Word (1967) ===
The Presence of the Word: Some Prolegomena for Cultural and Religious History (1967) is an expanded version of his 1964 Terry Lectures at Yale University. It is a pioneering work in cultural studies and media ecology.

He writes, "[my] works do not maintain that the evolution from primary orality through writing and print to an electronic culture, which produces secondary orality, causes or explains everything in human culture and consciousness. Rather, [my] thesis is relationist: major developments, and very likely even all major developments, in culture and consciousness, are related, often in unexpected intimacy, to the evolution of the word from primary orality to its present state. But the relationships are varied and complex, with cause and effect often difficult to distinguish".

=== Fighting for Life (1981) ===
Ong subsequently developed his observations regarding polemic in The Presence of the Word (192–286) in his book length study Fighting for Life: Contest, Sexuality, and Consciousness (1981), the published version of his 1979 Messenger Lectures at Cornell University.

=== Orality and Literacy (1982) ===
In Ong's most widely known work, Orality and Literacy: The Technologizing of the Word (1982), he attempts to identify the distinguishing characteristics of orality by examining thought and its verbal expression in societies where the technologies of literacy (especially writing and print) are unfamiliar to most of the population.

Ong drew heavily on the work of Eric A. Havelock, who suggested a fundamental shift in the form of thought coinciding with the transition from orality to literacy in Ancient Greece. Ong describes writing as a technology that must be laboriously learned, and which effects the first transformation of human thought from the world of sound to the world of sight. This transition has implications for structuralism, deconstruction, speech-act and reader-response theory, the teaching of reading and writing skills to males and females, social studies, biblical studies, philosophy, and cultural history generally.

=== An Ong Reader (2002) ===
This 600-page selection of Ong's works is organized on the themes of orality and rhetoric. It includes his 1967 encyclopedia article on the "Written Transmission of Literature" (331–44); his most frequently cited article, his 1975 PMLA article "The Writer's Audience Is Always a Fiction" (405–27); and his most frequently reprinted article, his 1978 ADE Bulletin article "Literacy and Orality in Our Times" (465–78). Taken together, these three essays make up a coherent approach to the study of written literature against the background of oral tradition.

== Publications ==
=== Lectures ===
- 1964 Terry Lectures at Yale University, The Presence of the Word: Some Prolegomena for Cultural and Religious History (New Haven: Yale University Press, 1967)
- 1979 Cornell University Messenger Lectures on the Evolution of Civilization, Fighting for Life: Contest, Sexuality, and Consciousness (Ithaca: Cornell University Press, 1981)
- 1981 Alexander Lectures at the University of Toronto, Hopkins, the Self and God (Toronto: University of Toronto Press, 1986)
- 1985 Wolfson College Lectures at Oxford University, Opening Lecture, "Writing Is a Technology That Restructures Thought." In The Written Word: Literacy in Transition, ed. Gerd Baumann (Oxford: Clarendon Press, 1986)

=== Books ===
- Frontiers in American Catholicism (New York: Macmillan, 1957)
- Ramus and Talon Inventory (Cambridge, MA: Harvard University Press, 1958)
- Ramus, Method, and the Decay of Dialogue: From the Art of Discourse to the Art of Reason (Cambridge, MA: Harvard University Press, 1958)
- American Catholic Crossroads (New York: Macmillan, 1959)
- The Barbarian Within (New York: Macmillan, 1962)
- In the Human Grain (New York: Macmillan, 1967)
- Rhetoric, Romance, and Technology (Ithaca: Cornell University Press, 1971)
- Interfaces of the Word (Ithaca: Cornell University Press, 1977)
- Hopkins, the Self, and God (Toronto: University of Toronto Press, 1986)
- Faith and Contexts, 4 vols. Ed. Thomas J. Farrell and Paul A. Soukup. (Atlanta: Scholars Press, 1992–1999)
- Orality and Literacy: The Technologizing of the Word (2nd ed. New York: Routledge, 2002); has been translated into 11 languages
- An Ong Reader: Challenges for Further Inquiry. Ed. Thomas J. Farrell and Paul A. Soukup. (Cresskill, NJ: Hampton Press, 2002)

== See also ==
- Johannes Piscator
- Philosophical terminism, a term coined by Ong
