= Ontario Classical Association =

The Ontario Classical Association (OCA) was founded in 1944 with Eric A. Havelock as its first president. The association promotes the study of classics through lobbying, scholarships, and colloquia for members. Its membership consists primarily of university and secondary school classics teachers, as well as students and amateurs.

The group's second president was Reginald Seeley, who would go on to become the first president of the Classical Association of Canada in 1947. The OCA was the original publisher of Phoenix, and it was edited at the time by Mary White.
