= Mary White (classicist) =

Canadian historian (1908–1977)

Mary Estelle White
- Born: 1908; Campbellford, Ontario, Canada
- Died: 1977 (aged 68–69)
- Occupation: Classicist

Academic work
- Institutions: Trinity College, Toronto; University of Toronto
- Main interests: Classics; Ancient Greece

Mary Estelle White (1908–1977) was a Canadian classicist and university Professor. She was the first editor of the journal Phoenix, and a fellow of the Royal Society of Canada.

== Career ==
Mary White graduated with her bachelor's degree at Queen's University, Kingston in 1929, having specialized in Greek and Latin, and quickly followed this with a post-graduate programme in the United Kingdom where she studied Literae Humaniores at St. Hugh's College, Oxford University. Returning to Canada in 1933, she initially taught at McMaster University before gaining a full-time position at Trinity College (University of Toronto) in 1941. After this contract became permanent in 1946, she was a founding member of both the Classical Association of Canada and its journal Phoenix, which she edited from 1946 to 1964.

White eventually gained an endowed professorship in 1963 and, in 1965, became the head of the Graduate Department of Classical Studies for the University of Toronto. She was admitted to the Royal Society of Canada, and became an honorary member of the Society for the Promotion of Hellenic Studies (then the Hellenic Society).

== Legacy ==
In memory of White, the journal Phoenix awards an annual 'Mary White Prize' for the best article published each year, and the University of Toronto has, since 1979, appointed an annual 'Mary White Lectureship in Classics'.

== Selected publications ==
- White, M. E. 1954. 'The dates of the Samian Tyranny', Journal of Hellenic Studies 74, 36–43.
- White, M. E. 1955. 'Greek Tyranny', Phoenix 9, 1–18.
- White, M. E. 1966. 'Phoenix: The First Twenty Years', Phoenix 20, 273–84.
- White, M. E. 1974. 'Hippias and the Athenian Archon List', in Evans, J. A. S. (ed.) Polis and Imperium: Studies in Honour of E T. Salmon. Toronto. 81–95.
