= Eric A. Havelock =

British classical philologist (1903–1988)

Eric Havelock, while at Yale

Eric Alfred Havelock (/ˈhævlɒk/; 3 June 1903 – 4 April 1988) was a British classicist who spent most of his life in Canada and the United States. He was a professor at the University of Toronto and was active in the Canadian socialist movement during the 1930s. In the 1960s and 1970s, he served as chair of the classics departments at both Harvard and Yale. Although he was trained in the turn-of-the-20th-century Oxbridge tradition of classical studies, which saw Greek intellectual history as an unbroken chain of related ideas, Havelock broke radically with his own teachers and proposed an entirely new model for understanding the classical world, based on a sharp division between literature of the 6th and 5th centuries BC on the one hand, and that of the 4th on the other.

Much of Havelock's work was devoted to addressing a single thesis: that all of Western thought is informed by a profound shift in the kinds of ideas available to the human mind at the point that Greek philosophy converted from an oral to a literate form. The idea has been controversial in classical studies, and has been rejected outright both by many of Havelock's contemporaries and modern classicists. Havelock and his ideas have nonetheless had far-reaching influence, both in classical studies and other academic areas. He and Walter J. Ong (who was himself strongly influenced by Havelock) essentially founded the field that studies transitions from orality to literacy, and Havelock has been one of the most frequently cited theorists in that field; as an account of communication, his work profoundly affected the media theories of Harold Innis and Marshall McLuhan. Havelock's influence has spread beyond the study of the classical world to that of analogous transitions in other times and places.

== Education and early academic career ==
Born in London on 3 June 1903, Havelock grew up in Scotland where he attended Greenock Academy before enrolment at The Leys School in Cambridge, England, at the age of 14. He studied there with W. H. Balgarnie, a classicist to whom Havelock gives considerable credit. In 1922, Havelock started at Emmanuel College, Cambridge.

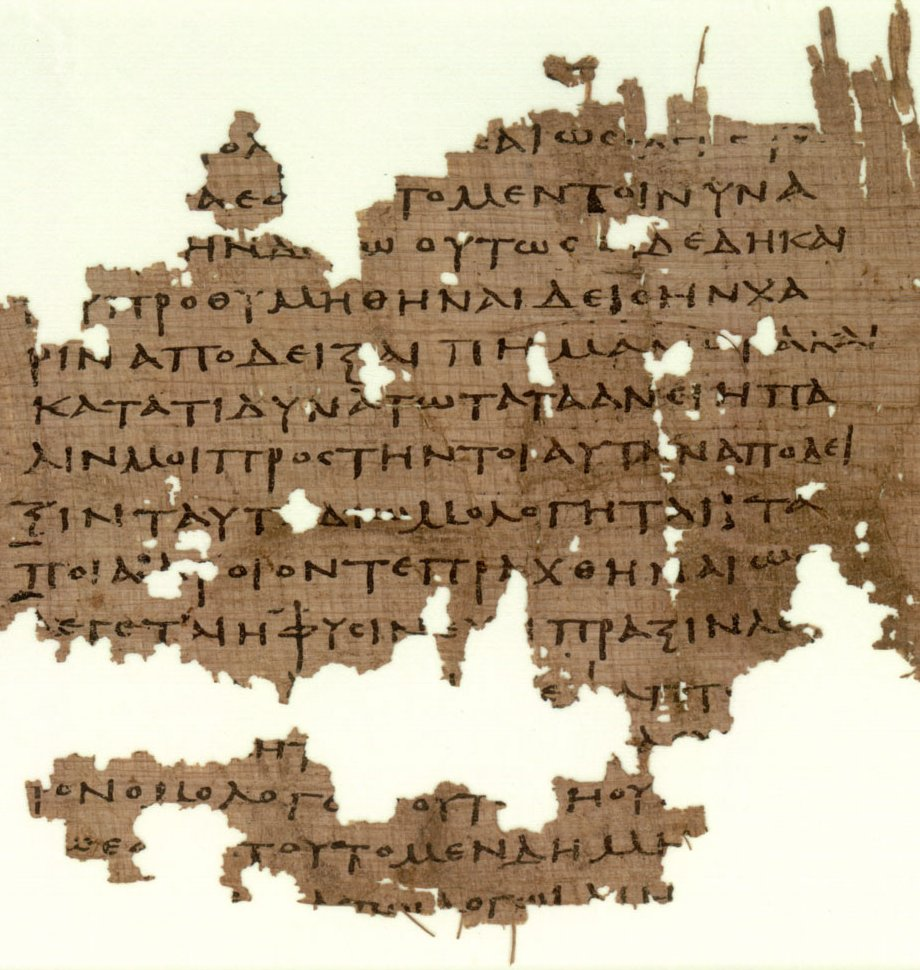
Papyrus manuscript of Plato's Republic

While studying under F. M. Cornford at Cambridge, Havelock began to question the received wisdom about the nature of pre-Socratic philosophy and, in particular, about its relationship with Socratic thought. In The Literate Revolution in Greece, his penultimate book, Havelock recalls being struck by a discrepancy between the language used by the philosophers he was studying and the heavily Platonic idiom with which it was interpreted in the standard texts. It was well known that some of these philosophical texts (Parmenides, Empedocles) were written not only in verse but in the metre of Homer, who had recently been identified (still controversially at the time) by Milman Parry as an oral poet, but Cornford and other scholars of these early philosophers saw the practice as a fairly insignificant convention left over from Hesiod. Havelock eventually came to the conclusion that the poetic aspects of early philosophy "were matters not of style but of substance", and that such thinkers as Heraclitus and Empedocles actually have more in common even on an intellectual level with Homer than they do with Plato and Aristotle.

In 1926 Havelock took his first academic job at Acadia University in Nova Scotia, Canada. He married Ellen Parkinson in 1927, and moved on to Victoria College at the University of Toronto in 1929. Havelock's scholarly work during this period focused on Latin poetry, particularly Catullus, far from the early Greek philosophy he had worked on at Cambridge. While in Canada Havelock became increasingly involved in politics. With his fellow academics Frank Underhill and Eugene Forsey, Havelock was a cofounder of the League for Social Reconstruction, an organisation of politically active socialist intellectuals. He and Underhill were also the most outspoken of a group of dissident faculty members at the university.

Havelock's political engagement deepened rapidly. In 1931, after Toronto police had blocked a public meeting by an organisation the police claimed was associated with communists, he and Underhill wrote a public letter of protest, calling the action "short-sighted, inexpedient, and intolerable." The letter led to considerable tension between the leadership of the university and the activist professors led by Havelock and Underhill, as well as a sharply critical public reaction. All of the major newspapers in Toronto, along with a number of prominent business leaders, denounced the professors as radical leftists and their behaviour as unbecoming of academics.

Though the League for Social Reconstruction began as more of a discussion group than a political party, it became a force in Canadian politics by the mid-1930s. After Havelock joined the Co-operative Commonwealth Federation, along with several other members of the League, he was pressured by his superiors at the university to curtail his political activity. He did not, continuing to act as an ally and occasional spokesman for Underhill and other leftist professors. He found himself in trouble again in 1937 after criticising both the government's and industry's handling of an automotive workers' strike. Despite calls from Ontario officials for his ouster, he was able to remain at Victoria College, but his public reputation was badly damaged.

While at Toronto, Havelock began formulating his theory of orality and literacy, establishing the context of a later movement at the university interested in the critical study of communication, which Donald F. Theall has called the "Toronto School of Communications". Havelock's work was complemented by that of Harold Innis, who was working on the history of media. The work Havelock and Innis began in the 1930s was the preliminary basis for the influential theories of communication developed by Marshall McLuhan and Edmund Snow Carpenter in the 1950s.

During World War II, Havelock moved away from the socialist organisations he had been associated with, and in 1944 was elected founding president of the Ontario Classical Association. One of the association's first activities was organising a relief effort for Greece, which had just been liberated from Nazi control. Havelock continued to write about politics, however, and his political and academic work came together in his ideas about education; he argued for the necessity of an understanding of rhetoric for the resistance to corporate persuasiveness.

== Toward a new theory of Greek intellectual history ==
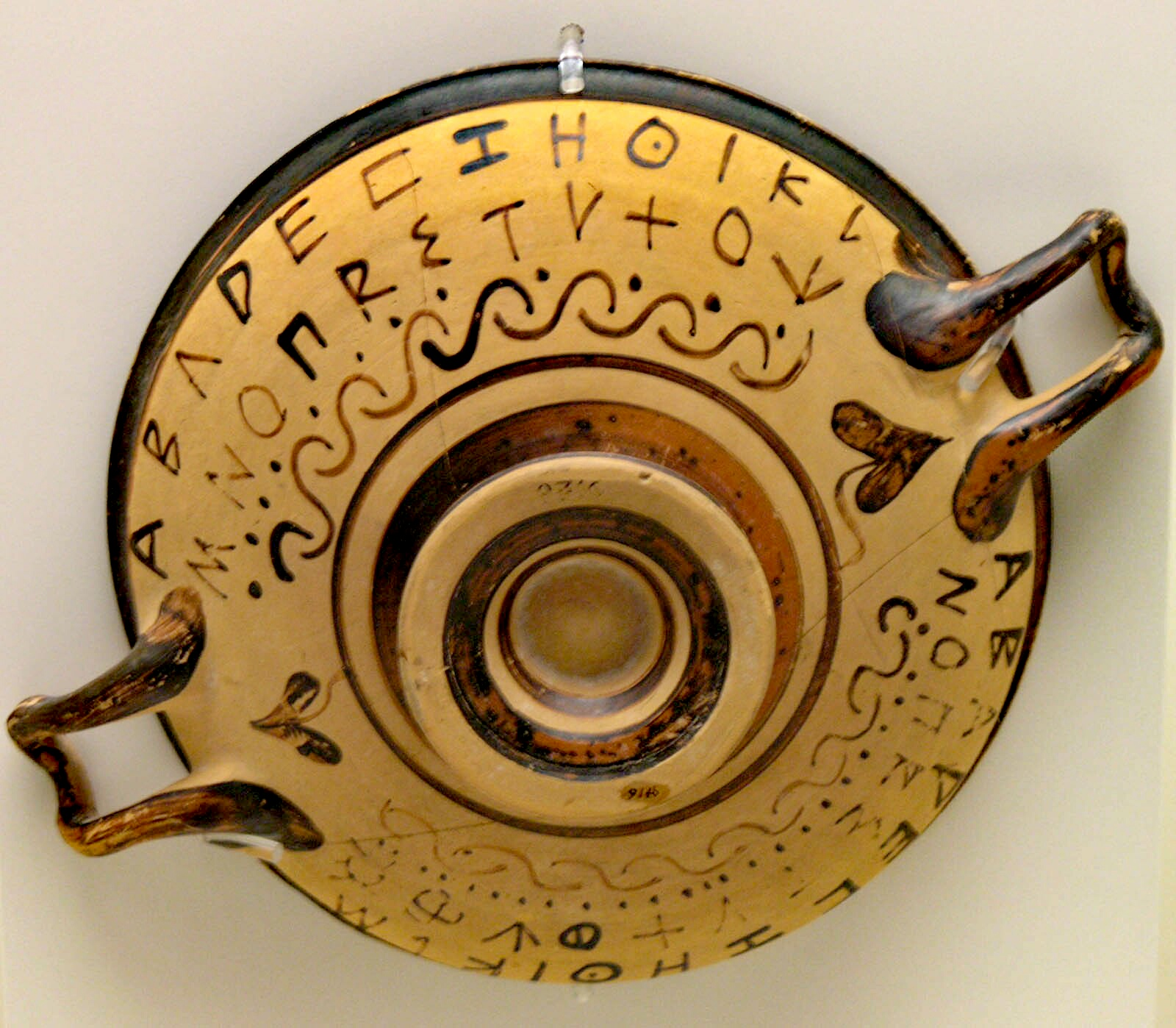
Attic cup inscribed with the Greek alphabet. Havelock argued that the simplicity and spacing of the alphabet was crucial to the development of literate culture.

At the same time that he was becoming increasingly vocal and visible in politics, Havelock's scholarly work was moving toward the concerns that would occupy him for the bulk of his career. The first questions he raised about the relationship between literacy and orality in Greece concerned the nature of the historical Socrates, which was a long-debated issue. Havelock's position, drawn from analyses of Xenophon and Aristophanes as well as Plato himself, was that Plato's presentation of his teacher was largely a fiction, and intended to be a transparent one, whose purpose was to represent indirectly Plato's own ideas. He argued vociferously against the idea associated with John Burnet, which still had currency at the time, that the basic model for the theory of forms originated with Socrates. Havelock's argument drew on evidence for a historical change in Greek philosophy; Plato, he argued, was fundamentally writing about the ideas of his present, not of the past. Most earlier work in the field had assumed that, since Plato uses Socrates as his mouthpiece, his own philosophical concerns must have been similar to those debated in the Athens of his youth, when Socrates was his teacher. Havelock's contention that Socrates and Plato belonged to different philosophical eras was the first instance of one that would become central to his work: that a basic shift in the kinds of ideas being discussed by intellectuals, and the methods of discussing them, happened at some point between the end of the 5th century BC and the middle of the 4th.

In 1947, Havelock moved to Cambridge, Massachusetts, to take a position at Harvard University, where he remained until 1963. He was active in a number of aspects of the university and of the department, of which he became chair; he undertook a translation of and commentary on Aeschylus's Prometheus Bound for the benefit of his students. He published this translation, with an extended commentary on Prometheus and the myth's implications for history, under the title The Crucifixion of Intellectual Man (and then changed it back to Prometheus when the book was republished in the 1960s, saying that the earlier title had "come to seem a bit pretentious"). During this time he began his first major attempt to argue for a division between Platonic or Aristotelian philosophy and what came before. His focus was on political philosophy and, in particular, the beginnings of Greek liberalism as introduced by Democritus. In his book The Liberal Temper in Greek Politics, he argued that for Democritus and the liberals, political theory was based on an understanding of "the behaviour of man in a cosmic and historical setting": that is, humanity defined as the poets would define it—measured through its individual actions. Plato and Aristotle were interested in the nature of humanity and, in particular, the idea that human actions might be rooted in inherent qualities rather than consisting of individual choices.

In arguing for a basic heuristic split between Plato and the contemporaries of Democritus, Havelock was directly contradicting a very long tradition in philosophy that had painstakingly assembled innumerable connections between Plato and the pre-Socratics, to reinforce the position that Plato, as his own dialogues imply, was primarily informed by his teacher Socrates, and that Socrates in turn was a willing participant in a philosophical conversation already several hundred years old (again, with a seeming endorsement from Plato, who shows a young Socrates conversing with and learning from the pre-Socratics Parmenides and Zeno in his dialogue the Parmenides—a historical impossibility that might represent figuratively an intellectual rather than direct conversation). The book was intriguing to many philosophers but was poorly received among some classicists, with one reviewer calling Havelock's argument for basic difference between Plato and the pre-Socratics "a failure" and his analysis of Plato and Aristotle "distortion." Some problems have persisted in research of Greek literacy, and in the main, the interest in continuing the line of research has been sustained in scholarship since Havelock's death.

== Preface to Plato ==
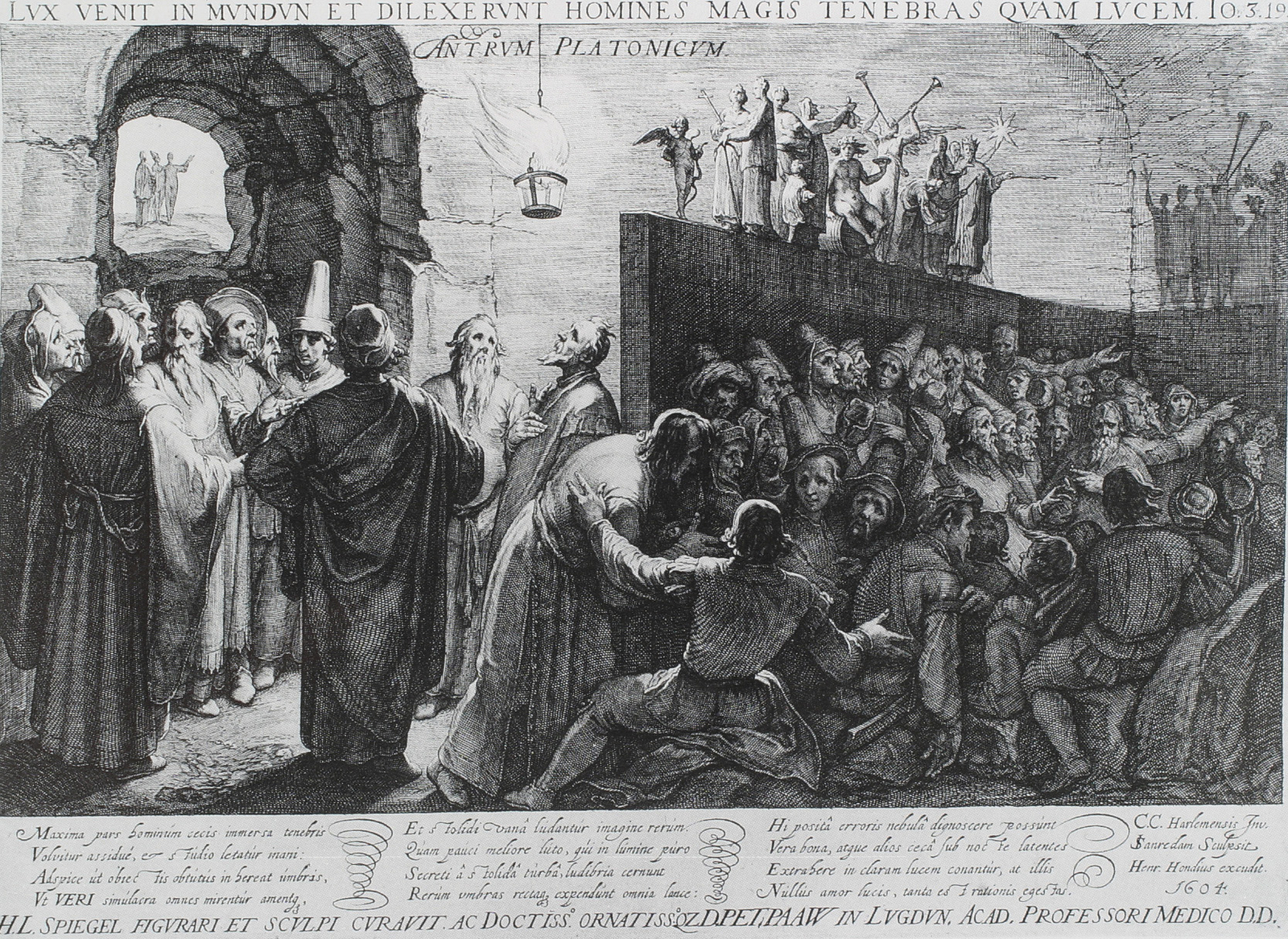
A 17th-century illustration of Plato's allegory of the cave

The Liberal Temper makes the argument for the division between Plato and early Greek philosophy without a fully realised account of Havelock's theory of Greek literacy, which he was still developing throughout this period. Rather than attempting once again to explain his distinction between 5th- and 4th-century BC thought in terms of a dissection of the earlier school, Havelock turned, in his 1963 Preface to Plato, to 4th-century BC philosophy itself. He was interested principally in Plato's much debated rejection of poetry in the Republic, in which his fictionalised Socrates argues that poetic mimesis—the representation of life in art—is bad for the soul. Havelock's claim was that the Republic can be used to understand the position of poetry in the "history of the Greek mind." The book is divided into two parts, the first an exploration of oral culture (and what Havelock thinks of as oral thought), and the second an argument for what Havelock calls "The Necessity of Platonism" (the title of Part 2): the intimate relationship between Platonic thought and the development of literacy. Instead of concentrating on the philosophical definitions of key terms, as he had in his book on Democritus, Havelock turned to the Greek language itself, arguing that the meaning of words changed after the full development of written literature to admit a self-reflective subject; even pronouns, he said, had different functions. The result was a universal shift in what the Greek mind could imagine:

We confront here a change in the Greek language and in the syntax of linguistic usage and in the overtones of certain key words which is part of a larger intellectual revolution, which affected the whole range of the Greek cultural experience ... Our present business is to connect this discovery with that crisis in Greek culture which saw the replacement of an orally memorised tradition by a quite different system of instruction and education, and which therefore saw the Homeric state of mind give way to the Platonic.

Two distinct phenomena are covered by the shift Havelock observed in Greek culture at the end of the 5th century BC: the content of thought (in particular the concept of man or of the soul), and the organisation of thought. In Homer, Havelock argues, the order of ideas is associative and temporal. The epic's "units of meaning ... are linked associatively to form an episode, but the parts of the episode are greater than the whole." For Plato, on the other hand, the purpose of thought is to arrive at the significance of the whole, to move from the specific to the general. Havelock points out that Plato's syntax, which he shares with other 4th-century BC writers, reflects that organisation, making smaller ideas subordinate to bigger ideas. Thus, the Platonic theory of forms in itself, Havelock claims, derives from a shift in the organisation of the Greek language, and ultimately comes down to a different function for and conception of the noun.

Preface to Plato had a profound impact almost immediately after publication, but an impact that was complex and inconsistent. The book's claims refer to the ideas of a number of different fields: the study (then fairly new) of oral literature as well as Greek philosophy and Greek philology; the book also acknowledges the influence of literary theory, particularly structuralism. The 1960s were a period in which those fields were growing further apart, and the reaction to Preface from each of them was starkly different. Among classicists the response ranged from indifference to derision, with the majority simply questioning the details of Havelock's history of literacy, pointing both to earlier instances of writing than Havelock thinks possible or to later instances of oral influence. Philosophy, particularly Platonic scholarship, was moving in a different direction at the time, and Havelock neither engages nor was cited by the principal movers in that field. However, the book was embraced by literary theorists, students of the transition to literacy, and others in fields as diverse as psychology and anthropology.

There have been affirmations and criticism of Havelock's methods. His account of orality is based almost entirely on Homer, but the history of the Homeric text is not known, which forces Havelock to make claims based on assumptions that cannot fully be tested. The works of Milman Parry on Homer were instrumental in developing the orientation to his work, and the breakthrough sustained research which Havelock prepared. The "Parry-Lord thesis" was introduced by Rosalind Thomas, to clarify the import of this approach. Some later classicists argue that the poetic nature of Homer's language works against the very arguments Havelock makes about the intellectual nature of oral poetry. What he asserts as a definitive use of language can never be conclusively demonstrated not to be an accident of "metrical convenience." Homerists, like Platonists, found the book to be less than useful for the precise work of their own discipline; many classicists rejected outright Havelock's essential thesis that oral culture predominated through the 5th century BC. At the same time, though, Havelock's influence, particularly in literary theory, was growing enormously. He is the most cited writer in Walter J. Ong's influential Orality and Literacy other than Ong himself. His work has been cited in studies of orality and literacy in African culture and the implications of modern literacy theory for library science. Preface to Plato has remained continuously in print since its initial publication.

== Later years ==
Shortly after publication of Preface to Plato, Havelock accepted a position as chair of the Classics Department at Yale University. He remained in New Haven for eight years, and then taught briefly as Raymond Distinguished Professor of Classics at the State University of New York at Buffalo. He retired in 1973 and moved to Poughkeepsie, New York, where his wife Christine Mitchell, whom he had married in 1962, taught at Vassar College. He was a productive scholar after his retirement, writing three books as well as numerous essays and talks expanding the arguments of Preface to Plato to a generalised argument about the effect of literacy on Greek thought, literature, culture, society, and law.

Increasingly central to Havelock's account of Greek culture in general was his conception of the Greek alphabet as a unique entity. He wrote in 1977:

The invention of the Greek alphabet, as opposed to all previous systems, including the Phoenician, constituted an event in the history of human culture, the importance of which has not as yet been fully grasped. Its appearance divides all pre-Greek civilisations from those that are post-Greek.

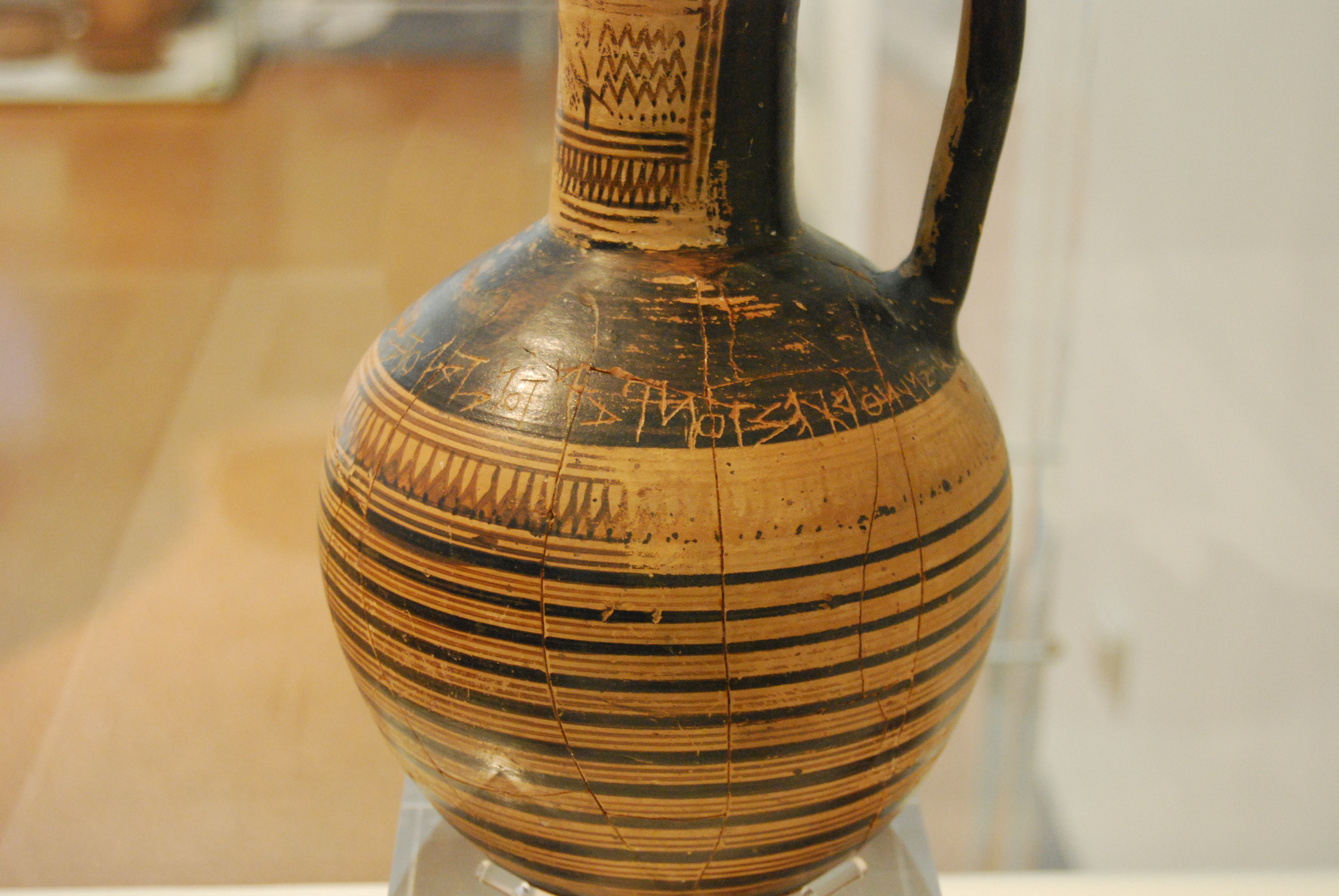
Vase from c. 750–690 BC, scratched with a poetic line in early versions of Greek letters

But his philological concerns now were only a small part of a much larger project to make sense of the nature of the Greek culture itself. His work in this period shows a theoretical sophistication far beyond his earlier efforts, extending his theory of literacy toward a theory of culture itself. He said of the Dipylon inscription, a poetic line scratched into a vase and the earliest Greek writing known at the time, "Here in this casual act by an unknown hand there is announced a revolution which was destined to change the nature of human culture." It is this larger point about the differences between oral and literate culture that represents Havelock's most influential contribution. Walter J. Ong, for example, in assessing the significance of non-oral communication in an oral culture, cites Havelock's observation that scientific categories, which are necessary not only for the natural sciences but also for historical and philosophical analysis, depend on writing. These ideas were sketched out in Preface to Plato but became central to Havelock's work from Prologue to Greek Literacy (1971) onward.

In the latter part of his career, Havelock's relentless pursuit of his unvarying thesis led to a lack of interest in addressing opposing viewpoints. In a review of Havelock's The Greek Concept of Justice, a book that attempts to ascribe the most significant ideas in Greek philosophy to his linguistic research, the philosopher Alasdair MacIntyre accuses Havelock of a "brusque refusal to recognize the substance of the case he has to defeat." As a result of this refusal, Havelock seems to have been caught in a conflict of mere contradiction with his opponents, in which without attempt at refutation, he simply asserts repeatedly that philosophy is fundamentally literate in nature, and is countered only with a reminder that, as MacIntyre says, "Socrates wrote no books."

In his last public lecture, which was published posthumously, Havelock addressed the political implications of his own scholarly work. Delivered at Harvard on 16 March 1988, less than three weeks before his death, the lecture is framed principally in opposition to the University of Chicago philosopher Leo Strauss. Strauss had published a detailed and extensive critique of Havelock's The Liberal Temper in Greek Politics in March 1959, as "The Liberalism of Classical Political Philosophy" in the journal Review of Metaphysics. (Strauss died 14 years later in 1973, the same year in which Havelock retired.) Havelock's 1988 lecture claims to contain a systematic account of Plato's politics; Havelock argues that Plato's idealism applies a mathematical strictness to politics, countering his old teacher Cornford's assertion that Platonic arguments that morality must be analyzable in arithmetical terms cannot be serious. This way of thinking about politics, Havelock concluded, could not be used as a model for understanding or shaping inherently nonmathematical interactions: "The stuff of human politics is conflict and compromise."

== Major works ==
- The Lyric Genius of Catullus. Oxford: Blackwell, 1939.
- The Crucifixion of Intellectual Man, Incorporating a Fresh Translation into English Verse of the Prometheus Bound of Aeschylus. Boston: Beacon Press, 1950. Reprinted as Prometheus. Seattle: University of Washington Press, 1968.
- The Liberal Temper in Greek Politics. New Haven: Yale University Press, 1957.
- Preface to Plato. Cambridge: Harvard University Press, 1963.
- Prologue to Greek Literacy. Cincinnati: University of Cincinnati Press, 1971.
- The Greek Concept of Justice: From its Shadow in Homer to its Substance in Plato. Cambridge: Harvard University Press, 1978.
- The Literate Revolution in Greece and its Cultural Consequences. Princeton, N.J.: Princeton University Press, 1981.
- The Muse Learns to Write: Reflections on Orality and Literacy from Antiquity to the Present. New Haven: Yale University Press, 1986.
