= Oral Tradition (journal) =

Journal

- Discipline: Multidisciplinary humanities, Folklore
- Language: English

Publication details
- History: 1986–present
- Frequency: Bi-annual

Standard abbreviations
- ISO 4: Oral Tradit.

Indexing
- ISSN: 0883-5365

Links
- Journal homepage

Oral Tradition is a peer-reviewed academic journal established in 1986 by John Miles Foley covering studies in oral tradition and related fields. As well as essays treating certifiably oral traditions, the journal presents investigations of the relationships between oral and written traditions, accounts of important fieldwork, and transcriptions and translations of oral texts. Oral Tradition periodically publishes special issues devoted to specific conceptual topics and regional traditions, and it often includes audiovisual materials in the form of companions linked to individual articles. The publication spans a number of academic fields and disciplines, including, folklore, cultural anthropology, social anthropology, ethnography, ethnomusicology, linguistics, classics, and comparative literature.

== Publication history ==
From 1986 till the end of 2006, Oral Tradition was published by Slavica Publishers, with an additional online edition through Project MUSE from 2003 onward. However, both of these publication venues are subscription-based, and for that reason they unavoidably excluded a substantial segment of the journal's potential readership, particularly non-western academics and institutions. To rectify this, since 2006, Oral Tradition has been published open access and exclusively online by the Center for Studies in Oral Tradition (from 2006 to 2019) and by Harvard University's Center for Hellenic Studies (beginning in 2019).

== See also ==
- Intangible cultural heritage
- Traditional knowledge
- Oral history
- Storytelling
