= Phoenix (classics journal) =

- Discipline: Classics
- Language: English and French

Publication details
- History: 1946–present
- Publisher: Classical Association of Canada (Canada)
- Frequency: semi-annual

Standard abbreviations
- ISO 4: Phoenix (Toronto)

Indexing
- ISSN: 0031-8299 (print); 1929-4883 (web)
- JSTOR: phoenix
- OCLC no.: 263597032

Links
- Journal homepage

Phoenix, originally The Phoenix, is one of two peer-reviewed journals of the Classical Association of Canada (the other is Mouseion), and the oldest classics journal published in Canada.

Phoenix is published as two double issues a year containing scholarly papers embodying original research in all areas of classical studies: the literature, language, history, philosophy, religion, mythology, science, archaeology, art, architecture, and culture of the Greek and Roman worlds from earliest times to about A.D. 600. The journal's editors also encourage submissions on other peoples of the ancient world in the context of their interactions with the Greeks and Romans, as well as papers on the reception of the ancient world and the history of Classical scholarship.

== History ==
The Phoenix was founded in 1946 as the first journal of classics in Canada, by the country's first organisation for the study of classics, the Ontario Classical Association. When the nationwide Classical Association of Canada was founded in 1947, the Ontario Classical Association transferred to it responsibility for The Phoenix.
