= Oral law =

Code of conduct transmitted by oral tradition

An oral law is a code of conduct used in a given culture, religion, or community, in which a rule or a body of rules governing human behaviour is transmitted by oral tradition and effectively respected.

Many cultures and traditions have maintained oral law, while most contemporary legal systems have a formal written organisation. The oral tradition (from the Latin tradere = to transmit) is the typical instrument of transmission of the oral codes or, more generally, the complex of what a culture transmits of itself among the generations, "from father to son". This kind of transmission can be due to lack of other means, such as in illiterate or criminal societies, or can be expressly required by the same law.

There has been a continuous debate over oral versus written transmission, with a focus on the perceived higher reliability of written evidence, primarily based on the "linear world of academia" where only written down records are accepted. However, "standard" theories of orality and literacy have been proposed.

== In jurisprudence ==
From a legal point of view, an oral law can be:

- a habit, or custom with legal relevance or when the formal law expressly refers to it (but in this latter case, it is properly an indirect source of legal rights and obligations);
- a spoken command or order that has to be respected as a law (in most modern legal systems, some dispositions can be issued by word in given cases of emergency).

An oral law, intended as a body of rules, can be admitted in jurisprudence as long as it shows some efficacy, therefore it needs that the law is public, the human action is evaluated by a judge (ordinarily producing a sentence according to the general interpretation of the law) and then a punishment has eventually to be put into effect. Some oral laws provide all these elements (for instance, some codes of conduct in use among criminal associations like the Mafia do have a well known law, a judge, a condemnation), while others usually miss some of them.

== Albanian customary law ==
The Kanun is a set of Albanian traditional customary laws, which has directed all the aspects of the Albanian tribal society. For at least the last five centuries and until today, Albanian customary laws have been kept alive only orally by the tribal elders. The success in preserving them exclusively through oral systems is an indication of ancient origins. Strong pre-Christian motifs mixed with motifs from the Christian era reflect the stratification of the Albanian customary law across various historical ages. The Kanun has held a sacred – although secular – longstanding, unwavering and unchallenged authority with a cross-religious effectiveness over the Albanians, which is attributed to an earlier pagan code common to all the Albanian tribes. The northern Albanian customary law is among the Albanian literary monuments that are of interest to Indo-European studies, reflecting many legal practices of great antiquity. It has been pointed out that "The laws governing such matters as hospitality, the rights of the heads of households, marriage, blood-feuds and payment of damages find precise echoes in Vedic India and ancient Greece and Rome".

Over time, Albanian customary laws have undergone their historical development, they have been changed and supplemented with new norms, in accordance with certain requirements of socio-economic development. According to some historical sources, the government of the Roman and Byzantine empire had to recognize autonomous customary laws to the various local communities for their self-administration. In this context, during different periods, Albanian customary laws were implemented in parallel with Roman, Byzantine, Ecclesiastic, and subsequently Sharia and Ottoman laws. This helped the Albanian mountain tribes to preserve their way of life, identity, and neutrality in the face of external centralizing administration.

== In Judaism ==
Rabbinic Judaism maintains that the books of the Tanakh were transmitted in parallel with an oral tradition, as relayed by God to Moses and from him handed on to the scholarly and other religious leaders of each generation. Thus, in Judaism, the "Written Instruction" (Torah she-bi-khtav תורה שבכתב) comprises the Torah and the rest of the Tanakh; the "Oral Instruction" (Torah she-be'al peh תורה שבעל פה) was ultimately recorded in the Talmud (lit. "Learning") and Midrashim (lit. "Interpretations"). The interpretation of the Oral Torah is thus considered as the authoritative reading of the Written Torah. Further, Halakha (lit. "The Path", frequently translated as "Jewish Law") is based on a written instruction together with an oral instruction. Jewish law and tradition is thus not based on a literal reading of the Tanakh, but on the combined oral and written tradition.

== See also ==
- Common law
- Customary law
- Hadith
- Jurisprudence
- Revelation
- Uncodified constitution
