= Secondary orality =

Orality that is dependent on literate culture

Secondary orality is orality that is dependent on literate culture and the existence of writing, such as a television anchor reading the news or radio. While it exists in sound, it does not have the features of "primary orality" because it presumes and rests upon literate thought and expression, and may even be people reading written material. Thus, secondary orality is usually not as repetitive, redundant, agonistic, etc. the way primary orality is, and cultures that have a lot of secondary orality are not necessarily similar to primarily oral cultures. Secondary orality should not be confused with "oral residue" in which a culture has not fully transitioned to literate / written culture and retains many of the characteristics of primary oral cultures. Secondary orality is a phenomenon of post-literacy, whereas oral residue is a stage in the transition from pre-literate to literate.

== Terminology ==
Walter J. Ong first described the concept of secondary orality in his publication Rhetoric, Romance, and Technology (1971):

Secondary orality is founded on—though it departs from—the individualized introversion of the age of writing, print, and rationalism which intervened between it and primary orality and which remains as part of us. History is deposited permanently, but not inalterably, in personality structure.

Ong's most popular exposition of primary orality and secondary orality came with his book Orality and Literacy (1982; 2nd ed. 2002), which discussed the differences between oral and literate cultures. Ong used the phrase "secondary orality," describing it as "essentially a more deliberate and self-conscious orality, based permanently on the use of writing and print." According to his way of thinking, secondary orality is not primary orality, the orality of pre-literate cultures. Oral societies operated on polychronic time, with many things happening at once—socialization played a great role in the operation of these cultures, memory and memorization were of greater importance, increasing the amount of copiousness and redundancy. Oral cultures were additive rather than subordinate, closer to the human life world, and more situational and participatory than the more abstract qualities of literate cultures.

== The Gutenberg Parenthesis ==
Ong notes that human communication has been dominated by oral culture, and the first signs of literacy date only 6 000 years ago. Tom Pettitt agrees with Ong, by considering literate learning more the anomaly than the rule. He considers this to be a post-Gutenberg era where knowledge is formed through digital media, delivered over the internet. Calling the previous 500 years a "Gutenberg Parenthesis," a term coined by Lars Ole Sauerberg, Pettitt explains that before Gutenberg, knowledge was formed orally and, now, in this post-Gutenberg era, knowledge is formed—increasingly—through "secondary orality" on the Internet.

== McLuhan's Global Village ==
Marshall McLuhan discusses in The Gutenberg Galaxy (1962) his notion of the "global village", a concept that can be related to Ong's account of secondary orality. Liliana Bounegru notes the emergence of social media (e.g. Facebook) and microblogging (i.e.Twitter) are re-tribalizing our cultures. Conversations in these social spaces are written, but are more conversational in tone than written communications; they are "rapid communication with large groups of people in a speed that would resemble oral storytelling, without having to share the same physical space with your audience."
