= Meerovich =

Meerovich or Meyerovich are transliterations from Russian "Меерович" of the Jewish patronymic surname literally meaning "son of Meyer (name)": 'Meyer' + '-vich' according to East Slavic naming rules. It may aloso be the patronymic part of an East Slavic name. Other surnames of the same origin include Meyerowitz, Majerowicz, Meyrowitz.

Notable people with the surname include:

- Boris Meyerovich (multiple people)
- Duvid Meerovich, birth name of Dovid Knut
- Daniel-Mordkhe Meyerovich, later Mark Meyerovich, initial names of Mark Daniel (1900–1940), Soviet Jewish Yiddish writer and playwright
