= Toronto school of communication theory =

School of though in communications

The Toronto School is a school of thought in communication theory and literary criticism, the principles of which were developed chiefly by scholars at the University of Toronto. It is characterized by exploration of Ancient Greek literature and the theoretical view that communication systems create psychological and social states. The school originated from the works of Eric A. Havelock and Harold Innis in the 1930s, and grew to prominence with the contributions of Edmund Snow Carpenter, Northrop Frye, Ursula Franklin, and Marshall McLuhan.

Since 1963, the Centre for Culture and Technology in the University of Toronto's Faculty of Information has carried the mandate for teaching and advancing the school. Notable contemporary scholars associated with the Toronto School include Derrick de Kerckhove, Robert K. Logan and Barry Wellman.

== History and development ==
The Toronto School has been described as "the theory of the primacy of communication in the structuring of human cultures and the structuring of the human mind." Eric Havelock's studies in the transitions from orality to literacy, as an account of communication, profoundly affected the media theories of Harold Innis and Marshall McLuhan. Harold Innis' theories of political economy, media and society had a significant influence on critical media theory and communications and with McLuhan, offered groundbreaking Canadian perspectives on the function of communication technologies as key agents in social and historical change. Together, their works advanced a theory of history in which communication is central to social change and transformation.

In the early 1950s, McLuhan began the Communication and Culture seminars, funded by the Ford Foundation, at the University of Toronto. As his reputation grew, he received a growing number of offers from other universities and, to keep him, the university created the McLuhan Program in Culture and Technology (now a part of the Centre for Culture and Technology) in 1963. He published his first major work during this period: The Mechanical Bride (1951) was an examination of the effect of advertising on society and culture. He also produced an important journal, Explorations, with Edmund Carpenter, throughout the 1950s. With Innis, Havelock, Derrick de Kerckhove and Barry Wellman, McLuhan and Carpenter have been characterized as the Toronto School of Communication. McLuhan remained at the University of Toronto through 1979, spending much of this time as head of his Centre for Culture and Technology.

== Key works ==
=== Empire and Communications ===
Published in 1950 by Harold Innis, Empire and Communications is based on six lectures he delivered at Oxford University in 1948. The series, known as the Beit Lectures, was dedicated to exploring British imperial history. However, Innis decided to undertake a sweeping historical survey of how communications media influence the rise and fall of empires. He traced the effects of media such as stone, clay, papyrus, parchment and paper from ancient to modern times.

Innis argued that the "bias" of each medium either toward space or toward time helps determine the nature of the civilization in which that medium dominates. "Media that emphasize time are those that are durable in character such as parchment, clay and stone," he writes in his introduction. These media tend to favour decentralization. "Media that emphasize space are apt to be less durable and light in character, such as papyrus and paper." These media generally favour large, centralized administrations. Innis believed that to persist in time and to occupy space, empires needed to strike a balance between time-biased and space-biased media. Such a balance is likely to be threatened however, when monopolies of knowledge exist favouring some media over others.

=== The Bias of Communication ===
In his 1947 presidential address to the Royal Society of Canada, Innis remarked: "I have attempted to suggest that Western civilization has been profoundly influenced by communication and that marked changes in communications have had important implications." He went on to mention the evolution of communications media from the cuneiform script inscribed on clay tablets in ancient Mesopotamia to the advent of radio in the 20th century. "In each period I have attempted to trace the implications of the media of communication for the character of knowledge and to suggest that a monopoly or oligopoly of knowledge is built up to the point that equilibrium is disturbed." Innis argued, for example, that a "complex system of writing" such as cuneiform script resulted in the growth of a "special class" of scribes. The long training required to master such writing ensured that relatively few people would belong to this privileged and aristocratic class. As Paul Heyer explains:

In the beginning, which for Innis means Mesopotamia, there was clay, the reed stylus used to write on it, and the wedge-shaped cuneiform script. Thus did civilization arise, along with an elite group of scribe priests who eventually codified laws. Egypt followed suit, using papyrus, the brush, and hieroglyphic writing.

=== The Mechanical Bride (1951) ===
Marshall McLuhan's The Mechanical Bride: Folklore of Industrial Man (1951) is a study in the field now known as popular culture. His interest in the critical study of popular culture was influenced by the 1933 book Culture and Environment by F. R. Leavis and Denys Thompson, and the title The Mechanical Bride is derived from a piece by the Dadaist artist, Marcel Duchamp.

=== The Gutenberg Galaxy (1962) ===
The Gutenberg Galaxy: The Making of Typographic Man (written in 1961, first published in Canada by University of Toronto Press in 1962) is a study in the fields of oral culture, print culture, cultural studies, and media ecology. Throughout the book, McLuhan takes pains to reveal how communication technology (alphabetic writing, the printing press, and the electronic media) affects cognitive organization, which in turn has profound ramifications for social organization:

...[I]f a new technology extends one or more of our senses outside us into the social world, then new ratios among all of our senses will occur in that particular culture. It is comparable to what happens when a new note is added to a melody. And when the sense ratios alter in any culture then what had appeared lucid before may suddenly become opaque, and what had been vague or opaque will become translucent.

=== Understanding Media (1964) ===
McLuhan's most widely known work, Understanding Media: The Extensions of Man (1964), is a study in media theory. In it McLuhan proposed that media themselves, not the content they carry, should be the focus of study — popularly quoted as "the medium is the message". McLuhan's insight was that a medium affects the society in which it plays a role not by the content delivered over the medium, but by the characteristics of the medium itself. McLuhan pointed to the light bulb as a clear demonstration of this concept. A light bulb does not have content in the way that a newspaper has articles or a television has programs, yet it is a medium that has a social effect; that is, a light bulb enables people to create spaces during nighttime that would otherwise be enveloped by darkness. He describes the light bulb as a medium without any content. McLuhan states that "a light bulb creates an environment by its mere presence."

More controversially, McLuhan postulated that content had little effect on society — in other words, it did not matter if television broadcasts children's shows or violent programming, to illustrate one example — the effect of television on society would be identical. He noted that all media have characteristics that engage the viewer in different ways; for instance, a passage in a book could be reread at will, but a movie had to be screened again in its entirety to study any individual part of it.

== See also ==
- Harold Innis's communications theories
- Medium theory
- Frankfurt School
