= Medium theory =

Medium theory is a mode of analysis that examines the ways in which particular communication media and modalities impact the specific content (messages) they are meant to convey. It also refers to a set of approaches that can be used to convey the difference in meanings of messages depending on the channel through which they are transmitted. Medium theorists argue that media are not simply channels for transmitting information between environments but are themselves distinct social-psychological settings or environments that encourage certain types of interaction and discourage others.

Moreover, this set of approaches focuses on the distinct affordances that a given medium may possess that affects the messages that are being conveyed through it. The key assumption is that, rather than just being the means by which the communication takes place, media is a diverse set of environments that enable the communication to happen; as such, it may alter the meaning and sense of the information that is transferred through it. Accordingly, medium theory is distinct from the more generic 'media theory', the majority of which place its emphasis on the content of communication (e.g., sex and violence) rather than the medium.

Joshua Meyrowitz originated the term in his 1985 book, No Sense of Place. Meyrowitz used the term to refer to the body of literature that focuses on the technological aspects of media beyond their content. It aims to look beyond the content to the medium which reveals the key to its social impact. Such works includes to those of Harold Innis, Marshall McLuhan, Walter Ong, Jack Goody, and Neil Postman, among others.

Currently, medium theory occupies a marginal position within American communication and media studies. In Canada and elsewhere, the theory continues to inform studies that assess large-scale social changes that follow the adoption of a new medium.

== History ==
Joshua Meyrowitz originated the term medium theory in his 1985 book, No Sense of Place, as a unifying label for the body of work from various mid-20th-century scholars who explored how the different characteristics of different media motivate unique forms of interaction. (These works came from a variety of fields, including history, anthropology, political economy, philosophy, religion, classics, and communication.) This label described works that focused on the technological aspects of media beyond their content. To Meyrowitz, "the term media of communication refers to all channels and means through which information is transmitted among people except direct, face-to-face modes of communication." In a later work, Meyrowitz asks: "What are the characteristics of each medium…that make it physically, psychologically, and socially different from other media and from live interaction, regardless of content and grammar choices."

Though the term medium theory itself was coined in the 1980s, the roots of this mode of analysis can be found in each major development of a new medium throughout history.

In ancient Greece, Socrates observed that writing differed from oral dialogue in several key ways: written texts were incapable of answering questions put to them, reached audiences for which they were not intended, and weakened the memories of those who relied on them. His student Plato continued the tradition, but with a reversal of value judgments about at least some modes of orality versus text: Plato was enthusiastic about writing but wanted to banish the oral poets from his Republic. In the 15th century, Johannes Gutenberg touted the ways in which his own invention of movable type differed in method and potential effects from the work of the scribes. In the 16th century, Martin Luther and his followers consciously exploited the revolutionary potential of print via the first mass-mediated publicity campaign. With the advent of film in the early 20th century, film theorist Rudolf Arnheim defended film as being a potential art form as opposed to a simple mechanical reproduction of reality. He proposed a form of medium theory that suggested that artistic and scientific descriptions of reality were shaped as much by the peculiarities of the chosen medium of representation as by the reality being portrayed.

With the growing influence of electronic media in the 1940s and 1950s, political economist Harold Innis offered significant advancements to the development of medium theory with his Empire and Communications (1950) and The Bias of Communication (1951), two books that extend the principles of economic monopolies to the study of information monopolies. Innis rewrote the history of civilization, from early Mesopotamia and Egypt to the British Empire and the Nazis, as the history of communication media and their influences.

Perhaps the most notable medium theorist is Marshall McLuhan, who came into the public eye in the 1960s, during the increasing dominance of television, especially with his second medium theory book, Understanding Media (1964). McLuhan suggested that television and other electronic media were having a significant impact on the culture as they diminished the social significance of literacy.

== Micro and macro medium theory ==
Medium theory can be divided into microlevel and macrolevel issues. Microlevel medium theory explores the consequences of the choice of one medium over another in a particular situation, such as in initiating or ending a personal relationship, applying for a job, commanding troops, or interacting with one’s children. Macrolevel medium theory explores broader ques- tions about the ways in which changes in media have influenced modes of thinking, patterns of social organization, status differences, value systems, collective memory, and even the physical layout of the built environment

On the micro level, the core issue is the ways in which the medium that is selected a specific purpose influences a particular situation or interaction. Evidence of micro medium theory can be seen in the development of wearable fitness technology with the specific purpose aimed at increasing physical activity in the user.

In contrast, on the macro level, the primary focus is on how the addition of a new medium to a society's existing grid of media may alter social interactions, patterns of thinking, social roles, social institutions, and social structure in general. The invention of social media has sparked a worldwide revolution on people's interactions, status, and way of life. The social media algorithm, developed to maintain the user's attention, has influenced an increased polarization of stances on political and social issues in the United States.

== Innis' medium bias ==
Much of medium theory lies in Harold Adams Innis' theory of medium bias. Fundamentally, the theory of medium bias argues that a medium either has a bias for time or for space, and that this bias is dependent on the technology of the medium. For example, sculptures made of stone are time-biased, as they stay durable and are not prone to being destroyed over time. Paper and books are space-biased, as they can be efficiently transported over great distances, but will be physically damaged over time. Innis therefore argued that the medium used to share information had more of a societal impact than the content of the information itself.

Innis further argued that due to the different natures of space-biased media and time-biased media, they impacted different elements of social structure. While if a medium was time-biased, it "meant an emphasis on religion, hierarchy, and contraction", if a medium was space-biased, it " meant an emphasis upon the state, decentralization, and expansion".

== McLuhan's message ==
Marshall McLuhan is best known for his phrase "the medium is the message," by which he meant that each medium is a unique type of environment whose widespread use reshapes people and culture.

McLuhan's central argument was that every medium, through the way it appeals to human senses, shapes the experience of its audience differently, as every medium has a different set of devices that leads to the message being processed differently. This means that the medium does not only determine what the audience knows, but also how the audience thinks about it. On a simpler level, McLuhan explains how different media shape the audience's experience differently by creating two subgroups of media: hot media and cold media.

McLuhan also argues that the combination of human senses used to receive a message is a key element that makes one medium different from the others. This argument is connected to the idea of what McLuhan calls the "amputation" of senses. When a specific one of the five senses is cut off, then the other senses become more sharpened, which leads to a different kind of enhanced sensory experience that is granted to the audience by the medium in question. These "ratios" of sensory involvement are what make every medium unique and are the reason for McLuhan's perception that the medium is more important than the content of the message.

McLuhan believed that people should observe not only the media itself but "the ways in which each new medium disrupts tradition and reshapes social life." He believed that the social impact of the media was that they became an extension of the human senses, and alter the social world.

In his 1962 book The Gutenberg Galaxy, McLuhan argued that when new media technologies were introduced into society, the balance of human senses were reworked, highlighting some at the expense of others. For example, print media intensified the visual and separated it from other senses; in a particular sound. He even argued that print media helped create a sensory environment that produced Western capitalist societies—an environment that was bureaucratic and organized around mass production, an ideology of individualism, and a commitment to the nation-state as the fundamental social unit.

== Postman's views on sensationalism ==
American media theorist Neil Postman brought a new view to issues revolving around medium theory. Postman observed the evolution of media, especially television, and argued that it could be problematic to society due to the nature of the medium of television. Postman argues that television, as a medium, innately sensationalizes all of its content, including content that he argues should not be sensationalized. Postman claims that due to the fact that television displays its content in a sensationalist manner, the audience is more likely to judge based on images, and less likely to judge based on the ideas at hand or critical thinking.

Postman further criticizes the impact of the medium of television on society by arguing that television has now been put at the center of societal culture. He argues that television sensationalizes other elements of society that should not be sensationalized. He gives the examples of religion and education, stating that religious practices and methods of teaching in the classroom have become further sensationalized in a manner that is ultimately damaging to society. Building on this, Postman also claims that "in a culture in which one becomes a celebrity merely by appearing on television, the distinction between entertainment and anything else becomes odious".

== Sandra Ball-Rokeach and Melvin Defleur ==
Sandra Ball-Rokeach and Melvin Defleur developed the "dependency theory " in 1976. This theory combines psychoanalysis with social system theory, system and leisure method, and the basic elements of use and satisfaction theory, and defines that media satisfies the needs of specific audiences in a specific way in a specific society. The use of the audience determines the influence of the media; Media-dependent audiences will be more affected. But too much emphasis on the function of the media, less attention to the effect.

The progress of science and technology has led to the rapid development of media technology. The progress of media has brought about a series of social changes, a series of lifestyle changes brought by social media, and led to the dependence of some people on social media. When some popular social software fails, it will cause many netizens to be anxious. It can be said that to some extent, it reflects netizens' dependence on social media.

The biggest characteristic of media dependency theory is that it discusses the influence and path of media communication from the interactive perspective of "audience, media and society", to make the theory of "media and all parts of the overall social structure" suitable for theoretical analysis at different levels. Theoretically, the dependence between media and individuals is two-way, but it is more manifested as individual's unilateral dependence on media.

In fact, the Internet has entered people's life in various forms, not only as a medium, but also as a space for communication. Various studies on Internet use have also been developed, and the concepts of Internet dependence and Internet addiction have been put forward, which has become a branch of media dependency theory.

== Technological determinism ==
Medium theory has always been criticized for its technological determinism. Raymond Williams, one of the most ardent critics of this concept, believed that technological determinism 'emerges' from technical study and experiments, and then changes the sector or society in which it emerged from. This means that people adapt towards the new technologies that arise because it is the new modern way of doing it. The deterministic approach says that technology in itself has the power to change societies and the power to condition humans even though humans are the ones that are using said technology. Although Marshall McLuhan strongly believes that the introduction to any new media will change the way humankind lives, Williams argues that the new technology in itself has no real significance to social value unless it has been adapted to existing social and economic conditions.

== See also ==
- Media studies
