= Presence (telepresence) =

Presence is a theoretical concept describing the extent to which media represent the world (in both physical and social environments). Presence is further described by Matthew Lombard and Theresa Ditton as “an illusion that a mediated experience is not mediated." Today, it often considers the effect that people experience when they interact with a computer-mediated or computer-generated environment. The conceptualization of presence borrows from multiple fields including communication, computer science, psychology, science, engineering, philosophy, and the arts. The concept of presence accounts for a variety of computer applications and Web-based entertainment today that are developed on the fundamentals of the phenomenon, in order to give people the sense of, as Sheridan called it, “being there."

== Evolution of 'presence' as a concept ==
Typology of human experience in the study of presence

The specialist use of the word “presence” derives from the term “telepresence”, coined by Massachusetts Institute of Technology professor Marvin Minsky in 1980. Minsky's research explained telepresence as the manipulation of objects in the real world through remote access technology. For example, a surgeon may use a computer to control robotic arms to perform minute procedures on a patient in another room. Or a NASA technician may use a computer to control a rover to collect rock samples on Mars. In either case, the operator is granted access to real, though remote, places via televisual tools.

As technologies progressed, the need for an expanded term arose. Sheridan extrapolated Minsky’s original definition. Using the shorter “presence,” Sheridan explained that the term refers to the effect felt when controlling real world objects remotely as well as the effect people feel when they interact with and immerse themselves in virtual reality or virtual environments.

Lombard's conceptualization of presence

Lombard and Ditton went a step further and enumerated six conceptualizations of presence:

1. presence can be a sense of social richness, the feeling one gets from social interaction
2. presence can be a sense of realism, such as computer-generated environments looking, feeling, or otherwise seeming real
3. presence can be a sense of transportation. This is a more complex concept than the traditional feeling of one being there. Transportation also includes users feeling as though something is “here” with them or feeling as though they are sharing common space with another person together
4. presence can be a sense of immersion, either through the senses or through the mind
5. presence can provide users with the sense they are social actors within the medium. No longer passive viewers, users, via presence, gain a sense of interactivity and control
6. presence can be a sense of the medium as a social actor.

Lombard's work discusses the extent to which 'presence' is felt, and how strong the perception of presence is regarded without the media involved. The article reviews the contextual characteristics that contribute to an individual's feeling presence. The most important variables that are important in the determinants of presence are those that involve sensory richness or vividness - and the number and consistency of sensory outputs. Researchers believe that the greater the number of human senses for which a medium provides stimulation, the greater the capability of the medium to produce a sense of presence. Additional important aspects of a medium are visual display characteristics (image quality, image size, viewing distance, motion and color, dimensionality, camera techniques) as well as aural presentation characteristics, stimuli for other senses (interactivity, obtrusiveness of medium, live versus recorded or constructed experience, number of people), content variables (social realism, use of media conventions, nature of task or activity), and media user variables (willingness to suspend disbelief, knowledge of and prior experience with the medium). Lombard also discusses the effects of presence, including both physiological and psychological consequences of "the perceptual illusion of nonmediation." Physiological effects of presence may include arousal, or vection and simulation sickness, while psychological effects may include enjoyment, involvement, task performance, skills training, desensitization, persuasion, memory and social judgement, or parasocial interaction and relationships.

Lee's typology of virtual experience

Presence has been delineated into subtypes, such as physical-, social-, and self-presence. Lombard's working definition was "a psychological state in which virtual objects are experienced as actual objects in either sensory or nonsensory ways." Later extensions expanded the definition of "virtual objects" to specify that they may be either para-authentic or artificial. Further development of the concept of "psychological state" has led to study of the mental mechanism that permits humans to feel presence when using media or simulation technologies. One approach is to conceptualize presence as a cognitive feeling, that is, to take spatial presence as feedback from unconscious cognitive processes that inform conscious thought.

== Case studies ==
Several studies provide insight into the concept of media influencing behavior.

- Cheryl Bracken and Lombard suggested that people, especially children, interact with computers socially. The researchers found, via their study, that children who received positive encouragement from a computer were more confident in their ability, were more motivated, recalled more of a story and recognized more features of a story than those children who received only neutral comments from their computer.
- Nan, Anghelcev, Myers, Sar, and Faber found that the inclusion of anthropomorphic agents that relied on artificial intelligence on a Web site had positive effect on people’s attitudes toward the site. The research of Bracken and Lombard and Nan et al. also speak to the concept of presence as transportation. The transportation in this case refers to the computer-generated identity. Users, through their interaction, have a sense that these fabricated personalities are really “there”.
- Communication has been a central pillar of presence since the term’s conception. Many applications of the Internet today largely depend on virtual presence since its conception. Rheingold and Turkle offered MUDs, or multi-user dungeons, as early examples of how communication developed a sense of presence on the Web prior to the graphics-heavy existence it has developed today. “MUDs...[are] imaginary worlds in computer databases where people use words and programming languages to improvise melodramas, build worlds and all the objects in them, solve puzzles, invent amusements and tools, compete for prestige and power, gain wisdom, seek revenge, indulge greed and lust and violent impulses." While Rheingold focused on the environmental sense of presence that communication provided, Turkle focused on the individual sense of presence that communication provided. “MUDs are a new kind of virtual parlor game and a new form of community. In addition, text-based MUDs are a new form of collaboratively written literature. MUD players are MUD authors, the creators as well as consumers of media content. In this, participating in a MUD has much in common with script writing, performance art, street theater, improvisational theater – or even commedia dell’arte."
- Further blurring the lines of behavioral spheres, Gabriel Weimann wrote that media scholars have found that virtual experiences are very similar to real-life experiences, and people can confuse their own memories and have trouble remembering if those experiences were mediated or not.
- Philipp, Vanman, and Storrs demonstrated that unconscious feelings of social presence in a virtual environment can be invoked with relatively impoverished social representations. The researchers found that the mere presence of virtual humans in an immersive environment caused people to be more emotionally expressive than when they were alone in the environment. The research suggests that even relatively impoverished social representations can lead to people to behave more socially in an immersive environment.

== Presence in popular culture ==
- Sheridan's view of presence earned its first pop culture reference in 1984 with William Gibson’s pre-World Wide Web science fiction novel "Neuromancer", which tells the story of a cyberpunk cowboy of sorts who accesses a virtual world to hack into organizations.
- Joshua Meyrowitz's 1986 "No Sense of Place" discusses the impact of electronic media on social behavior. The novel discusses how social situations are transformed by media. Media, he claims, can change one's 'sense of place,'by mixing traditionally private versus public behaviors - or back-stage and front-stage behaviors, respectively, as coined by Erving Goffman. Meyrowitz suggests that television alone will transform the practice of front-stage and back-stage behaviors, as television would provide increased information to different groups who may physically not have access to specific communities but through media consumption are able to determine a mental place within the program. He references Marshall McLuhan's concept that 'the medium is the message,' and that media provide individuals with access to information. With new and changing media, Meyrowitz says that the patterns of information and shifting accesses to information change social settings, and help do determine a sense of place and behavior. With the logic that behavior is connected to information flow, Meyrowitz states that front- and back-stage behaviors are blurred and may be impossible to untangle.

== See also ==
- Collective consciousness
- Social presence
- Telepresence
- Virtual reality
- Surround sound
- Hyperpersonal model
- Noosphere
- Social reality
- Pictorial realism
- Blended Space
