= Meyerowitz =

Meyerowitz (Polish: Majerowicz) is a Yiddish-language surname. It is a patronymic surname literally meaning "descendant of Meyer" (Polish phonetic transcription: Majer), derived with the Polish-language patronymic suffix -wicz.

It can be transcribed via Russian language as Meyerovich. The surname may refer to:

- Elliot Meyerowitz (born 1951), American biologist
- Herbert Vladimir Meyerowitz (1900–1945), British artist
- Jan Meyerowitz (1913–1998), German-American composer
- Joel Meyerowitz (born 1938), American photographer
- Rick Meyerowitz (born 1943), American artist

== See also ==
- 22537 Meyerowitz, asteroid
- The Meyerowitz Stories, a 2017 film
- Meyrowitz
