= Boris Meyerovich =

Boris Meyerovich may refer to:

- Boris Meyerovich (animator), Soviet animator who worked, among others, on The Enchanted Boy and The Scarlet Flower
- Boris Semyonovich Meyerovich (b. 1977), Russian footballer
