= Meyrowitz =

Meyrowitz may refer to:

- Bob Meyrowitz, radio producer and fight promoter
- Carol Meyrowitz (born 1954), American business executive
- Joshua Meyrowitz (born 1949), American communications professor
- Norman Meyrowitz, American computer scientist

== See also ==
- Meyerowitz (disambiguation)
