= Harold Innis's communications theories =

Role of media in shaping civilizations

Harold Adams Innis (November 5, 1894 – November 8, 1952) was a professor of political economy at the University of Toronto and the author of seminal works on Canadian economic history and on media and communication theory. He helped develop the staples thesis, which holds that Canada's culture, political history and economy have been decisively influenced by the exploitation and export of a series of staples such as fur, fish, wood, wheat, mined metals and fossil fuels. Innis's communications writings explore the role of media in shaping the culture and development of civilizations. He argued, for example, that a balance between oral and written forms of communication contributed to the flourishing of Greek civilization in the 5th century BC. But he warned that Western civilization is now imperiled by powerful, advertising-driven media obsessed by "present-mindedness" and the "continuous, systematic, ruthless destruction of elements of permanence essential to cultural activity."

== Communications theories ==
=== Time and space ===
Improvements in communication...make for increased difficulties of understanding.

— Harold Innis, The Bias of Communication

One of Harold Innis's primary contributions to the field of communications was to apply the dimensions of time and space to various media. He divided media into time-biased and space-biased types. Time-biased media include clay or stone tablets, hand-copied manuscripts on parchment or vellum and oral sources such as Homer's epic poems. These are intended to carry stories and messages that last for many generations, but tend to reach limited audiences. Space-biased media are more ephemeral. They include modern media such as radio, television, and mass circulation newspapers that convey information to many people over long distances, but have short exposure times. While time-biased media favour stability, community, tradition and religion, space-biased media facilitate rapid change, materialism, secularism and empire. Innis elaborated on his distinctions between time-biased and space-biased media in Empire and Communications:

The concepts of time and space reflect the significance of media to civilization. Media that emphasize time are those durable in character such as parchment, clay and stone. The heavy materials are suited to the development of architecture and sculpture. Media that emphasize space are apt to be less durable and light in character such as papyrus and paper. The latter are suited to wide areas in administration and trade. The conquest of Egypt by Rome gave access to supplies of papyrus, which became the basis of a large administrative empire. Materials that emphasize time favour decentralization and hierarchical types of institutions, while those that emphasize space favour centralization and systems of government less hierarchical in character.

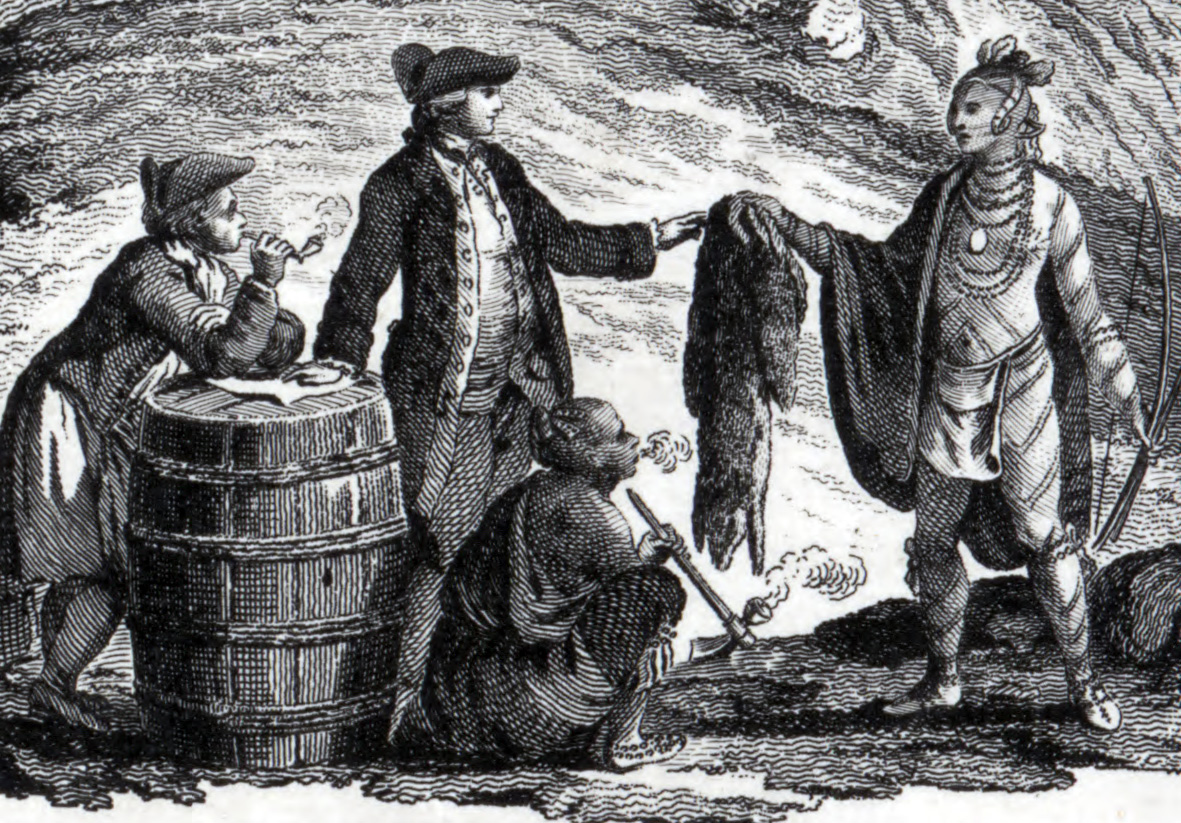
The encounter of European traders from a space-bound print culture with indigenous hunters from a time-bound oral culture. Innovation meets tradition with disastrous, long-term results.

Societies that depend solely on time-biased media are oral and tribal. Although leadership tends to be hierarchical, time-bound societies may also operate by consensus. Since, in their purest form, time-bound cultures do not rely on written records, they must preserve their traditions in story, song and myth handed down unchanged from one generation to the next. For them memory is of crucial importance; they revere the wisdom of elders and favour concrete over abstract forms of thought. On the other hand, societies that depend on space-biased media such as printed newspapers and books tend to favour abstract thought and control over space. They have little regard for tradition and when compared with oral societies, their ways of thinking are apt to be more rational, linear and impersonal.

The encounter of European traders from the imperial centres of France and Britain with the aboriginal tribes of North America that Innis chronicled in The Fur Trade in Canada is a poignant example of what can happen when two different civilizations meet --- one traditional and oriented to preserving its tribal culture in time and the other bent on spreading its influence over long distances. European guns used in war and conquest, for example, enabled the indigenous peoples to hunt more efficiently, but led to the rapid destruction of their food supply and of the beaver they depended on to obtain European goods. Conflicts over hunting territories led to warfare, made more deadly by European bullets. And all this, Innis argued, disturbed the balance that "...had grown up previous to the coming of the European."

=== Balance, bias and empire ===
Harold Innis examined the rise and fall of ancient empires as a way of tracing the effects of communications media. He looked at media that led to the growth of an empire; those that sustained it during its periods of success, and then, the communications changes that hastened an empire's collapse. He tried to show that media 'biases' toward time or space affected the complex interrelationships needed to sustain an empire. These interrelationships included the partnership between the knowledge (and ideas) necessary to create and maintain the empire, and the power (or force) required to expand and defend it. Innis wrote that the interplay between knowledge and power was always a crucial factor in understanding empire: "The sword and pen worked together. Power was increased by concentration in a few hands, specialization of function was enforced, and scribes with leisure to keep and study records contributed to the advancement of knowledge and thought. The written record, signed, sealed and swiftly transmitted was essential to military power and the extension of government."

Innis warned however, that such issues tended to obscure the differences between empires. So, he embarked on specific studies of the civilizations of ancient Egypt, Babylonia and Mesopotamia; as well as of the effects of the oral tradition on Greek civilization and the written tradition on the Roman Empire. His reflections appear in separate chapters in his book Empire and Communications along with additional chapters on the combined effects of parchment and paper in the Middle Ages, and paper and the printing press in the development of modern societies.

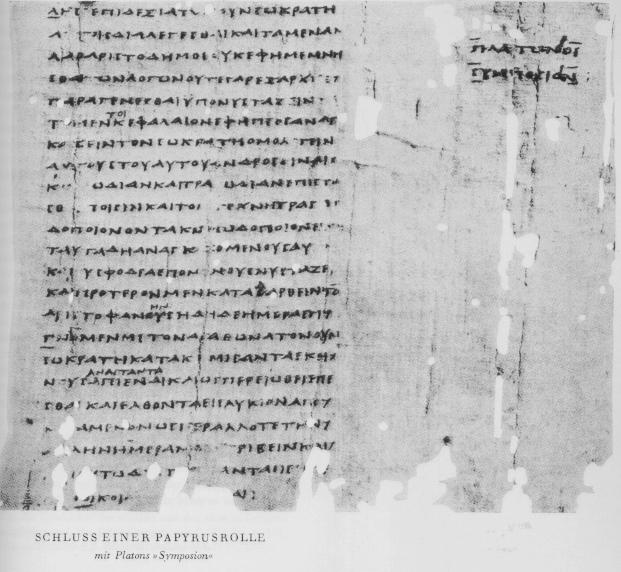
A papyrus copy of Plato's Symposium. Using the flexible Greek alphabet, Plato preserved the power of spoken dialogue in written prose. Innis thought this balancing of time and space-oriented media contributed to the cultural and intellectual vitality of ancient Greece.

Biographer John Watson warns against the tendency to apply Innis's concept of media 'bias' in a mechanical or deterministic way. He writes that Innis "emphasizes, in dealing with concrete historical cases, the necessity of a balance of various media whose predispositions [or biases] complement each other to make for a successful imperial project." Watson points out that for Innis, balance was crucial in sustaining an empire. Innis examined each empire to discover how time-binding and space-binding media contributed to the necessary balance between power and knowledge and among ruling groups – religious, political and military. As Innis himself wrote:

Concentration on a medium of communication implies a bias in the cultural development of the civilization concerned either towards an emphasis on space and political organization or towards an emphasis on time and religious organization. Introduction of a second medium tends to check the bias of the first and to create conditions suited to the growth of empire. The Byzantine empire emerged from a fusion of a bias incidental to papyrus in relation to political organization and of parchment in relation to ecclesiastical organization.

Innis argued that a balance between the spoken word and writing contributed to the flourishing of ancient Greece in the time of Plato. Plato conveyed his ideas by recording the conversations of Socrates. His philosophy thus preserved "the power of the spoken word on the written page." Plato's method of using poetic dialogues cast in prose enabled him to arrive at new philosophical positions. This balance between the time-biased medium of speech and the space-biased medium of writing was eventually upset, Innis argued, as the oral tradition gave way to the dominance of writing. The torch of empire then passed from Greece to Rome.

=== Monopolies of knowledge ===
In his 1947 presidential address to the Royal Society of Canada, Innis remarked: "I have attempted to suggest that Western civilization has been profoundly influenced by communication and that marked changes in communications have had important implications." He went on to mention the evolution of communications media from the cuneiform script inscribed on clay tablets in ancient Mesopotamia to the advent of radio in the 20th century. "In each period I have attempted to trace the implications of the media of communication for the character of knowledge and to suggest that a monopoly or oligopoly of knowledge is built up to the point that equilibrium is disturbed." Innis argued, for example, that a "complex system of writing" such as cuneiform script resulted in the growth of a "special class" of scribes. The long training required to master such writing ensured that relatively few people would belong to this privileged and aristocratic class. As Paul Heyer explains:

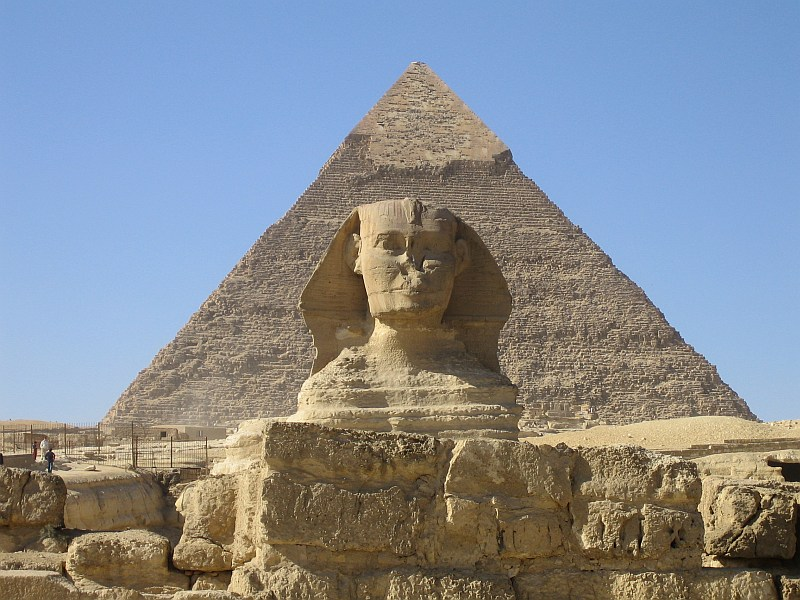
The Sphinx and the Great Pyramid at Giza. Innis wrote that the monarchs who built the pyramids had to relinquish their absolute power when papyrus replaced stone as the dominant medium of communication.

In the beginning, which for Innis means Mesopotamia, there was clay, the reed stylus used to write on it, and the wedge-shaped cuneiform script. Thus did civilization arise, along with an elite group of scribe priests who eventually codified laws. Egypt followed suit, using papyrus, the brush, and hieroglyphic writing.

In Empire and Communications, Innis wrote that the ebb and flow of Egypt's ancient empire partly reflected weaknesses or limitations imposed by "the inflexibility of religious institutions supported by a monopoly over a complex system of writing":

Writing was a difficult and specialized art requiring long apprenticeship, and reading implied a long period of instruction. The god of writing was closely related to the leading deities and reflected the power of the scribe over religion. The scribe had the full qualifications of a special profession and was included in the upper classes of kings, priests, nobles and generals, in contrast with peasants, fishermen, artisans and labourers. Complexity favoured increasing control under a monopoly of priests and the confinement of knowledge to special classes.

Innis argued that this priestly or scribal monopoly disturbed the necessary balance between the religious bias toward time and continuity, and the political bias toward space and power. "A successful empire," he wrote, "required adequate appreciation of the problems of space, which were in part military and political, and of problems of time, which were in part dynastic and biological and in part religious." He ended his essay on ancient Egypt by pointing to the imbalance that arose because the priestly monopoly over writing and knowledge supported an emphasis on time and religion, but neglected the political problems inherent in ruling over an empire extended in space.

According to Harold Innis, monopolies of knowledge eventually face challenges to their power, especially with the arrival of new media. He pointed for example, to the monasteries that spread throughout Europe after the fall of the Roman Empire. Their monopoly of knowledge depended on their control over the production of the time-binding medium of parchment useful for preserving hand-copied manuscripts written in Latin. Power was vested therefore, in a scribal and literate, religious elite. The largely illiterate laity depended on priests to interpret the scriptures and on image-driven media such as paintings and statues that depicted the central figures in Biblical stories.

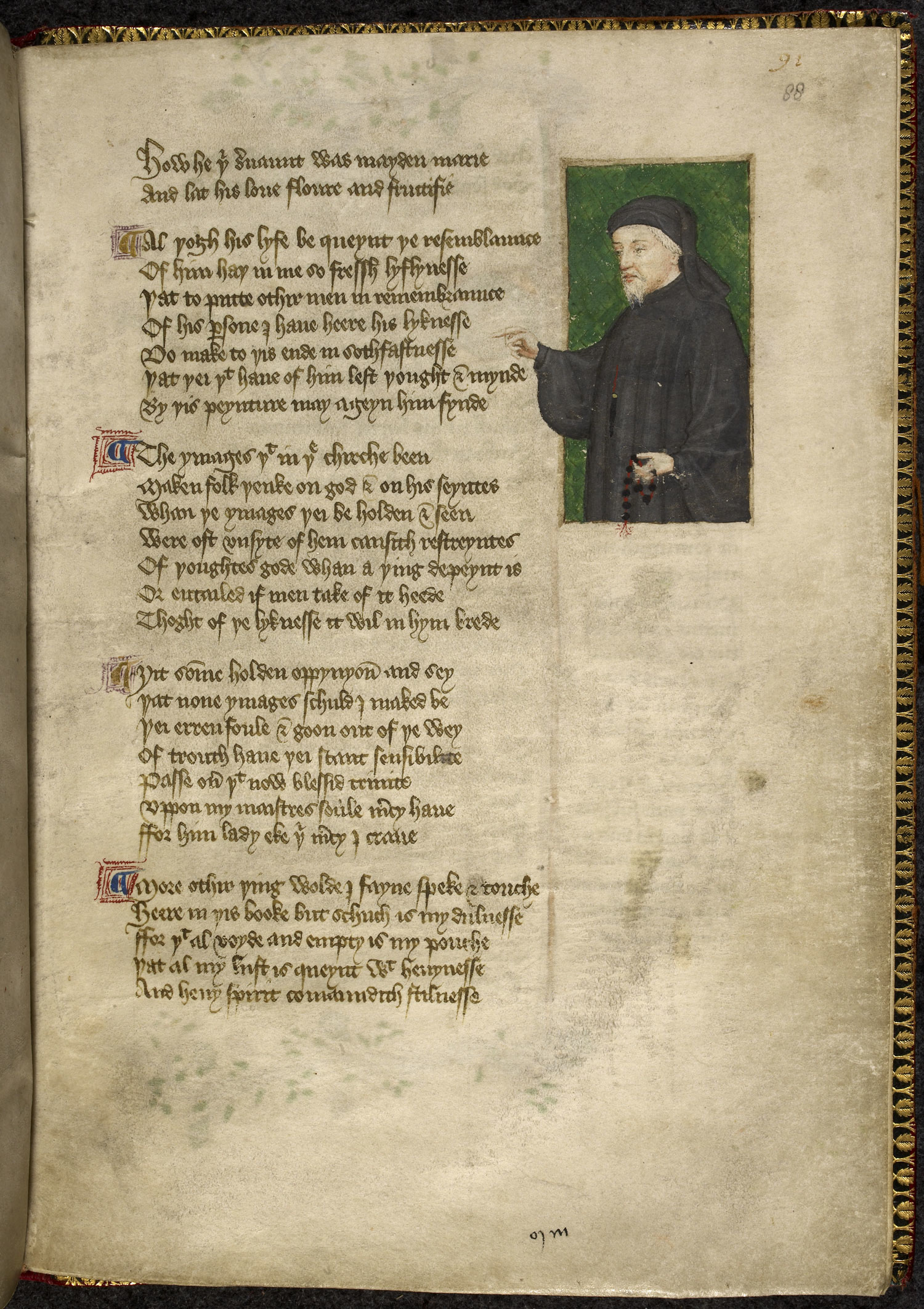
Geoffrey Chaucer (c. 1343 – 1400). Innis pointed out that Chaucer wrote in vernacular English instead of Latin or Norman French hastening the growth of English nationalism. _{Portrait of Chaucer by Thomas Hoccleve.}

But the space-binding medium of paper imported from China, Innis wrote, facilitated challenges from Islam and later from a rising commercial class. "Paper supported the growth of trade and cities and of education beyond the control of the monasteries, and in turn of the Church and the cathedrals." Paper also supported the rise of vernacular languages reducing Latin's cultural sway.

Innis wrote that the Catholic Church fought to preserve its time-oriented monopoly of knowledge with the Inquisition, but eventually paper achieved even greater power with the invention of the printing press around the middle of the 15th century. Now, the balance shifted decisively in favour of space over time. The Protestant Reformation followed, along with European exploration and empire, the rise of science and the evolution of the nation-state. Characteristically, Innis summarizes the far-reaching implications of the new medium of paper in a single paragraph that starts with the Middle Ages and ends with the modern United States:

The dominance of parchment in the West gave a bias toward ecclesiastical organization, which led to the introduction of paper, with its bias toward political organization. With printing, paper facilitated an effective development of the vernaculars and gave expression to their vitality in the growth of nationalism. The adaptability of the alphabet to large-scale machine industry became the basis of literacy, advertising and trade. The book as a specialized product of printing and, in turn, the newspaper strengthened the position of language as a basis of nationalism. In the United States, the dominance of the newspaper led to large-scale development of monopolies of communication in terms of space and implied a neglect of problems of time.

=== Western civilization in peril ===
Harold Innis's analysis of the effects of communications on the rise and fall of empires led him, in the end, to warn grimly that Western civilization was now facing its own profound crisis. The development of "mechanized" communications media such as mass-circulation newspapers had shifted the balance decisively in favour of space and power, over time, continuity and knowledge. Industrial societies cut time into precise fragments suitable to engineers and accountants and Western civilization suffered from an "obsession with present-mindedness" that eliminated concerns about past or future. Communications media that transmit information quickly over long distances had upset the balance required for cultural survival. "The overwhelming pressure of mechanization evident in the newspaper and the magazine," Innis wrote, "has led to the creation of vast monopolies of communication. Their entrenched positions involve a continuous, systematic, ruthless destruction of elements of permanence essential to cultural activity. The emphasis on change is the only permanent characteristic."

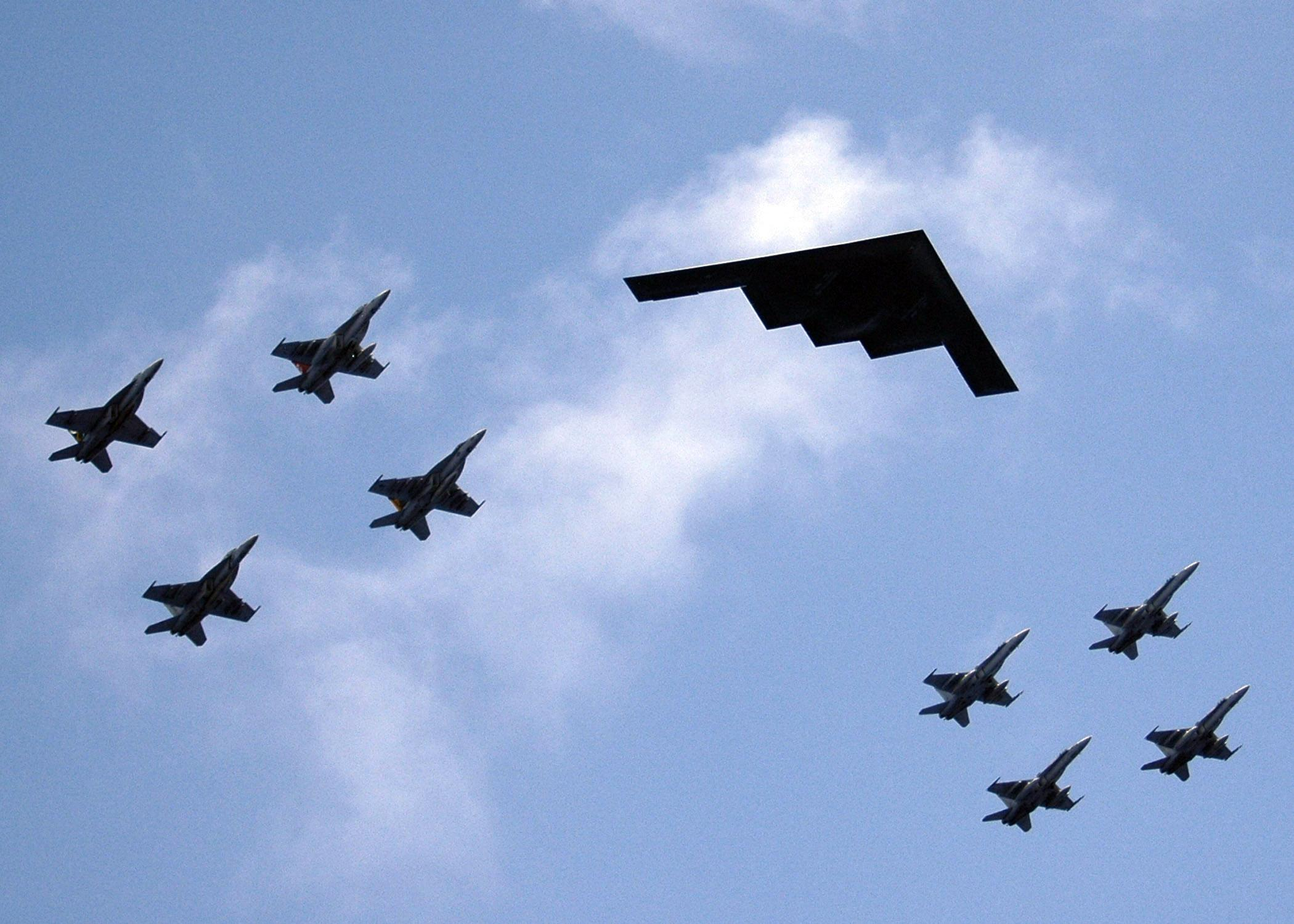
A B-2 Stealth Bomber leads an aerial flight formation during exercise Valiant Shield in 2006. Innis believed that advanced U.S. military technologies reinforced the American obsession with space, empire and force at the expense of time, tradition and knowledge.

The crisis facing the West was worsened, Innis argued, because communications monopolies that ran the media were largely immune from outside challenge. They literally spoke the language of the masses, effectively penetrating popular consciousness and shaping public opinion. American media, with their dependence on advertising and therefore mass appeal, were extremely effective at mobilizing large audiences. Not only were Americans exhorted to buy the newest "improved" products, they were also exposed to a barrage of propaganda from political elites. Theodore Roosevelt mastered the newspaper as a communications device, just as his fifth cousin, Franklin D. Roosevelt mastered radio. The news media were also influenced by a large public relations industry that shaped public opinion on behalf of powerful interests.

Innis believed that the overwhelming spatial bias of modern media was heightened in the United States by the development of powerful military technologies, including atomic weapons. The advent of the Cold War led to such an emphasis on military preparedness that the U.S. was placed on a permanent war footing, its economy increasingly dependent on the manufacture of weapons. As Canadian scholar Arthur Kroker writes, "Innis's political lesson was clear: the United States was now a fully 'space-oriented' society, with no inner coordinating principle and with no organic conception of 'lived tradition,' time, succession or duration which might act as an inner check against the politics of imperialism."

Biographer John Watson writes that "the United States represents to Innis something akin to cultural apocalypse." In an essay entitled, "Technology and Public Opinion in U.S.A," Innis concluded that the United States depended on a foreign policy shaped by military power. "Dependence on organized power and a traditional antipathy to coloured peoples weakens political sensitivity, and lack of experience with problems of continuity and empire threatens the Western world with uncertainty and war." Innis was among the first to suggest that the U.S. had lost the balance between power and knowledge essential to its long-term survival.

Western civilization could only be saved, Innis argued, by recovering the balance between space and time. For him, that meant reinvigorating the oral tradition within universities while freeing institutions of higher learning from political and commercial pressures. In his essay, A Plea for Time, he suggested that genuine dialogue within universities could produce the critical thinking necessary to restore the balance between power and knowledge. Then, universities could muster the courage to attack the monopolies that always imperil civilization.

== Influence of Innis's theories ==
Influenced by Innis's communications theories, historian Marshall Poe proposed a theory on the genesis of new media. He proposed that new media are "pulled" into existence by organized interests after inventors have already developed the technology, or prototypes of the technology, necessary to support the media. Poe's theory also predicts the effects the media will have on society by considering eight attributes of a medium: accessibility, privacy, fidelity, volume, velocity, range, persistence, and searchability.

Marshall McLuhan, Canadian philosopher, public intellectual and former colleague of Innis at the University of Toronto, also acknowledged Innis's impact on his own works, including The Gutenberg Galaxy and Understanding Media.

== See also ==
- Staples thesis and metropolitan-hinterland thesis, concepts in economic history also pioneered by Innis
- Empire and Communications
- Monopolies of knowledge
- Toronto School of communication theory
- Materiality (social sciences and humanities)
