= Boris Meyerovich (footballer) =

Russian footballer

Personal information
- Full name: Boris Semyonovich Meyerovich
- Date of birth: 1 September 1977 (age 49)
- Place of birth: Magnitogorsk, Russian SFSR
- Height: 1.81 m (5 ft 11 1/2 in)
- Positions: Defender; midfielder

Senior career*
| Years | Team | Apps | (Gls) |
| 1994 | FC Chernomorets Novorossiysk | 0 | (0) |
| 1994–1996 | FC Metallurg Magnitogorsk | 93 | (2) |
| 1997–1998 | FC Nosta Novotroitsk | 48 | (2) |
| 1999–2000 | FC Rubin Kazan | 38 | (0) |
| 2001 | FC Metallurg-Metiznik Magnitogorsk | 25 | (1) |
| 2002–2004 | FC KAMAZ Naberezhnye Chelny | 73 | (2) |
| 2005–2006 | FC Volgar-Gazprom Astrakhan | 58 | (0) |
| 2006 | FC Chernomorets Novorossiysk | 12 | (0) |
| 2007 | FC SKA Rostov-on-Don | 34 | (0) |
| 2008 | FC Chernomorets Novorossiysk | 16 | (0) |
| 2009 | FC Gornyak Uchaly | 25 | (0) |
- * Club domestic league appearances and goals

Boris Semyonovich Meyerovich (Russian: Борис Семёнович Меерович; born 1 September 1977) is a former Russian professional football player.

== Club career ==
He played 7 seasons in the Russian Football National League for 5 different clubs.
