= Joshua Meyrowitz =

American academic (born 1949)

Joshua Meyrowitz (born 1949) is a professor of communication at the Department of Communication at the University of New Hampshire in Durham. He has published works regarding the effects of mass media, including No Sense of Place: The Impact of Electronic Media on Social Behavior, an analysis of the effects various media technologies have caused, particularly television.

== Early life and education ==
Meyrowitz attended Queens College, CUNY from which he received a bachelor's degree in mass communication/drama in February 1972 and a master's degree in communication theory and media in June 1974. The topic of his thesis was "Relationship of interpersonal speaking distances to TV shot structure". He also attended New York University in the Media Ecology Program from which he received his PhD in media theory in February 1979. the topic of his dissertation was "Media evolution and changes in gender, age, and authority roles".

=== No Sense of Place ===
In No Sense of Place, which won the 1986 "Best Book on Electronic Media" Award of the National Association of Broadcasters and the Broadcast Education Association, Meyrowitz uses the example of the television to describe how communication technologies have shaped and influenced the social relations we encounter on a daily basis, proposing that television has been responsible for a significant cultural shift towards new and egalitarian social interactions. He argues that television is a "secret exposing" machine that allows individuals to watch others in an unprecedented fashion. According to Meyrowitz, new media like television have removed barriers and increased access to previously restricted information is responsible for the shift in cultural and social barriers between children and adults, men and women, and even humanizing and demystifying the powerful. The book is based on his doctoral dissertation also entitled No Sense of Place, which was completed in 1978 in the Media Ecology doctoral program at New York University; Christine Nystrom was Meyrowitz's thesis adviser, and the other members of his dissertation committee were Henry Perkinson and Neil Postman. In 1982, Postman published The Disappearance of Childhood, which discussed themes similar to one of the case studies in Meyrowitz's dissertation.

Meyrowitz draws upon Erving Goffman's work on social life, in the form of face-to-face interactions, as a kind of multi-stage drama (primarily from Goffman's work The Presentation of Self in Everyday Life) and Marshall McLuhan's work on changes in media of communication (primarily from McLuhan's works The Gutenberg Galaxy: The Making of Typographic Man and Understanding Media: The Extensions of Man). It has been suggested that Meyrowitz was either the first person to combine these theories for analysis, or he was the first to do so in a meaningful way.

Meyrowitz posits his initial theory, that modern electronic media (in this case, primarily in the form of television) have broken barriers that established concepts of place (i.e., cultural understanding of roles, locations, hierarchies, and more). He presents this view throughout the book, examining how it relates to different aspects of social and cultural construction (including the public versus private spheres of life, group identity, authority and hierarchy, etiquette, gender identity and gender roles, and childhood and adulthood).

The book's central contention is that new media like television have removed barriers in a manner unseen with media like print publications (including books and newspapers), radio, telephone, cinema, and other forms of mass media that predate television. Meyrowitz argues that it is the ease of use, ubiquity or nearly universal access to this information, and the blurring of front-stage and back-stage behavior that removes previous barriers of information (p. 53). Meyrowitz uses the example of relative access to books contrasted to access to television content. Further, he argues that books require a greater degree of literacy and varying levels of literacy and comprehension than does television (pp. 73–81). Examples offered include a parent's ability to restrict a child's access to particular types of literature contrasted with a child's easy access to various types of content on television, cultural barriers like guilds and professions that exclude non-members from access to specialized information, and the blending of traditionally private (or back-stage) environments into public (or front-stage) environments as in the case of televised Presidential cabinet meetings. Likewise, Meyrowitz observes that televisions shows (e.g., The West Wing), through storytelling, can reveal secrets about authority figures and institutions. Thus, positions once revered may lose their mystique and become viewed as commonplace.

=== Reviews and criticism ===
The book has been described as being "one of the most insightful books" regarding mass media and as having "staying power" and usefulness as a theory. The heuristic value and "staying power" of the book are attributed to the fact that the book examines the subject from a broad perspective, making it a readily adaptable resource and broadly applicable. Moreover, it is written in a style that can be read and understood by readers both inside and outside of academia.

However, "No Sense of Place" is also criticized as proposing modern media communication as the singular cause of change, making causal connections between the media and social and cultural changes without exploring other possible factors or influences. Lindlof also argues that some of the changes that Meyrowitz describes, e.g., the emergence of a middle stage from the perspective of media and the audience, may not be permanent and that adaptations to use of the media and its interpretations may evolve. This view of technology and the way users of technology may adapt its use and meaning is akin to Social Construction of Technology theory and the Dual Capacity model of communication. Social Construction of Technology theory argues that use of media is influenced by an agent's (both senders and receivers) attitudes and behaviors, their expertise of the medium, and external influences on the agents/users of the medium. In part, the Dual Capacity model of communication argues that the communication capabilities of the users (sender, receiver, and/or organization), in conjunction with the user's understanding of task contingencies (i.e., the task and the message) and normative contingencies (e.g., cultural norms) will influence choice of medium for communication.

Others have used "No Sense of Place" to support the notion that one's sense of place or location is "disembedded from local context"; thus, it is less defined by physical space than by the "electronic landscape" of media. These newer electronic media promote the establishment of group identity by "undermining the relationship between the physical location and information access." This is seen as especially true of mobile media (e.g., mobile phones), which allow for the medium to travel with the user, as well as creating the ability to be connected to (or "present" in) more than one place at the same time.

== Articles and journal publications ==
=== "Mediating Communication: What Happens?" ===
In the article "Mediating Communication: What Happens?", Meyrowitz explores television as providing a new form of human experience, one which distorts traditional social distinctions by discussing ideas of changed childhood, blended genders, and demystified leaders.

==== Changed childhood ====
According to Meyrowitz, television is the "secret-exposing machine", letting children in on the "biggest secret of all, 'the secret of secrecy'". Children become exposed to a variety of images and information, which "dilutes the innocence of childhood and the authority of the adults". Prior to television, parents could be completely aware of what their children were reading, making the censoring of information easier, compared to the lack of control parents have when it comes to television. As children become older the level at which they were able to read increases, allowing children to gradually explore adult issues. Television blurs the boundaries between children and adults because children are now given earlier access to information about those adult issues. Meyrowitz argues that it is for this reason that children appreciate television so much, it is able to "extend their horizons of experience".

==== Blended genders ====
Meyrowitz postulates that television has broken down distinctions between the sexes, enabling women to become aware of public realms of sport, war, politics and medicine and conversely for men to become in touch with their emotional, private side. He claims this has led "toward more career-oriented women and more family-oriented men, toward more work-oriented homes and more family-oriented workplaces", in essence a blending of the genders.

==== Demystified leaders ====
Meyrowitz states that prior to the saturation of television in society, our political leaders had been treated as a "mystified presence", at a status above the common citizen, as it was easier to control the flow of information that represented who they were and what they did. Although television is a useful tool for our politicians in trying to create this status, it "tends to mute differences between levels of social class". Meyrowitz terms this "a double-edge sword", as over-exposure of a political leader diminishes their power, with their continuous presence making them seem more ordinary and less mystified. This over-exposure is difficult to balance with under-exposure, as without media presence a leader has minimal power over people, yet with exceeding presence they lose power. Because of the immediacy of information to the common citizen about all issues of society, they are now able to closely inspect the image of our leaders, creating a demystification of their presence.

=== "Multiple media literacies" ===
Meyrowitz argues that most research focuses on defining media literacy to fit a contemporary definition or understanding of media, but that little attention is given to the concept of literacy itself. He proposes that there are a minimum of three types (or metaphors) of media literacy: media content literacy, media grammar literacy, and medium literacy. He suggests that media content literacy derives from the perspective of media as "conduits that carry messages"; media grammar literacy arises from a consideration of media as "distinct languages"; and, medium literacy develops from the perception of media as unique "environments", each possessing its own set of characteristics.

==== Media content literacy ====
Content literacy is the ability to decode and understand an intentional message and intentional and unintentional latent messages; awareness of content genre; awareness of cultural, institutional, and commercial influences; and, understanding that a message are contextual, and therefore interpreted differently by people. This model of literacy presumes that communication contains a message, delivered through a medium, and that the message can be analyzed apart from the medium through which it is delivered. The ability to access, evaluate, and interpret content is the foundation of content literacy. To further explain this concept, Meyrowitz uses news media. He argues that "keeping up with the news" is merely an elementary level of content literacy. Advanced literacy involves understandings of how news stories are constructed, the existence of inherent biases by news organizations and the individuals within them, and how various social, political, and institutional influences affect stories.

==== Media grammar literacy ====
Media grammar literacy considers each medium as its own language. Thus, each medium possesses its own grammar and how production variables affect elements of content. Meyrowitz offers examples for a few media. Print media production variables include page size and format, color, and texture, typeface design, size, and color, and the use of spacing, punctuation, negative space, graphics, and more. Photography production variables include framing, depth of field, lens type, exposure, film vs. digital, contrast, post-production effects, and more. He then acknowledges that television and film will use many of those production variables found in print and photography, but then add their own. Thus, despite the existence of some shared production variables in many media, each medium possess its own unique combination of variables.

Meyrowitz develops this concept further by examining various techniques used in television and film (e.g., camera angle and depth of field) and how they are used differently and similarly within different styles of this medium (e.g., news vs. documentaries and documentaries vs. fiction/drama). An example of how one subset borrows from another is use of documentary-style production values used in a dramatic movie in order to establish the appearance of factual storytelling rather than fiction. He argues that media grammar does not receive much attention, in part, because most people are unaware of the wide range of production variables used. However, he acknowledges that this is partly because producers of content generally want views to be aware of content elements and not the production elements. Yet, the more a person is exposed to a specific production variable, the more that variable becomes increasingly noticeable.

==== Medium literacy ====
Medium literacy is described as the fixed characteristics of a given medium. Meyrowitz writes that this type of literacy is most often associated with Marshall McLuhan's work, Understanding Media: The Extensions of Man. Medium literacy involves understanding the differences between one medium and another and how the inherent characteristics of each shapes communication on the micro and macro levels.

His examples of this include: type of sensory information (single or multiple; visual, auditory, or olfactory), form (e.g., image vs. text), degree of resolution (e.g., radio voice vs. live voice fidelity compared to television image vs. in-person image fidelity), speed of conveyance, and physical requirements for engagement (e.g., where and how does a person receive this message). Micro-level analysis involves individual and interpersonal situations. Meyrowitz offers dating as an example situation, specifically examining why someone might choose to begin a dating relationship in person (e.g., increased medium richness) vs. why one might choose to end the relationship over the phone (i.e., lower medium richness, no need to be present and deal with possible reaction). Macro-level analysis of medium literacy is situated in the societal level. One of his examples is how use of the telephone changed norms for dating rituals and business practices.

Meyrowitz writes that medium literacy is the "least common form of media analysis." He suggests that this may be due to the difficulty in observing environments created by a medium, especially in contrast to observing medium content or grammar. Finally, he offers that a medium's environment is most observable when the medium (or technology) is new to society. Once people are accustomed to the medium, its environment becomes increasingly more difficult to observe.

=== "The Rise of Glocality: New Senses of Place and Identity in the Global Village" ===
In "The Rise of Glocality" (2004), Meyrowitz proposes that "all experience is local"; that is, all physical experiences are proximal to our physical bodies. Despite the sophistication of technology - allowing us to communicate and experience people and places far from us and multi-task, we still engage this technology (thus, have the experience) in the time and place in which we are physically located. "The localness of experience is a constant." However, he argues that we do not necessarily construct our concepts or understanding of events (local or distant) from a uniquely local perspective. Different media allow us to incorporate "external perspectives" with which to understand and relate to the local and the distant.

Meyrowitz points out that the sociologists Charles Horton Cooley and George Herbert Mead furthered the concept that one's concept of the self is not defined solely by our corporeal properties, but that it is a "reflected concept." As social agents, we construct our understanding of the world and our surroundings through this lens of social meaning. Using Mead's concept of "the generalized other" and "significant others", he applies this to our use of media to construct concepts of place and meaning.

He proposes two ways in which this concept of self relates to media and place. Media have expanded our range of experience. We have social connections with people who are not proximal to ourselves. Likewise, while becoming more engaged with others distant to ourselves, we may become less engaged with the people in the places where we live. Additionally, media expand our concept of a "generalized elsewhere." This generalized elsewhere allows us to construct a broader understanding of the world, where our immediate community is not the only lens that serves us the construction of this concept. Our locality is no longer necessarily the center of our constructed world or the sole source for our experiences in the world. Meyrowitz suggests that this is of greater consequence today than ever before, because of modern media. These modern media help us to establish a much broader concept of the social arena - enhancing our connections to distant people and places and potentially weakening our local relationships, and establishing our locality as a mere "backdrop" for our experiences. Thus, we may live in a place without truly integrating into it. Further, he argues, the pervasive nature of modern media (e.g., mobile phones, computers and tablets, etc.) make it difficult to restrict our experiences to the local only. Effort is required to establish restricted boundaries around our experiences. Because of this, our definitions of a situation are varied and unstable, as our boundaries are permeable and ever changing.

== See also ==
- Broadcasting
- Dramaturgy (sociology)
- Medium theory
- Social construction of technology
