= Empire and Communications =

1950 book by Harold Innis

- Author: Harold Innis
- Language: English
- Genre: Non-fiction
- Publisher: Oxford University Press
- Publication date: 1950
- ISBN: 978-1-55002-662-7

Empire and Communications is a book published in 1950 by University of Toronto professor Harold Innis. It is based on six lectures Innis delivered at Oxford University in 1948. The series, known as the Beit Lectures, was dedicated to exploring British imperial history. Innis, however, decided to undertake a sweeping historical survey of how communications media influence the rise and fall of empires. He traced the effects of media such as stone, clay, papyrus, parchment and paper from ancient to modern times.

Innis argued that the "bias" of each medium toward space or toward time helps to determine the nature of the civilization in which that medium dominates. "Media that emphasize time are those that are durable in character such as parchment, clay and stone," he writes in his introduction. These media tend to favour decentralization. "Media that emphasize space are apt to be less durable and light in character, such as papyrus and paper." These media generally favour large, centralized administrations. Innis believed that to persist in time and to occupy space, empires needed to strike a balance between time-biased and space-biased media. Such a balance is likely to be threatened, however, when monopolies of knowledge exist favouring some media over others.

Empire and Communications examines the impact of media such as stone, clay, papyrus and the alphabet on the empires of Egypt and Babylonia. It also looks at the oral tradition in ancient Greece; the written tradition and the Roman Empire; the influence of parchment and paper in medieval Europe and the effects of paper and the printing press in modern times.

== Chapter 1. Introduction ==
Harold Innis's highly condensed prose style, which frequently ranges over many centuries and several key ideas in one or two sentences, can make his writing in Empire and Communications difficult to understand. Biographer Paul Heyer recommends that readers use Innis's introduction as a helpful guide.

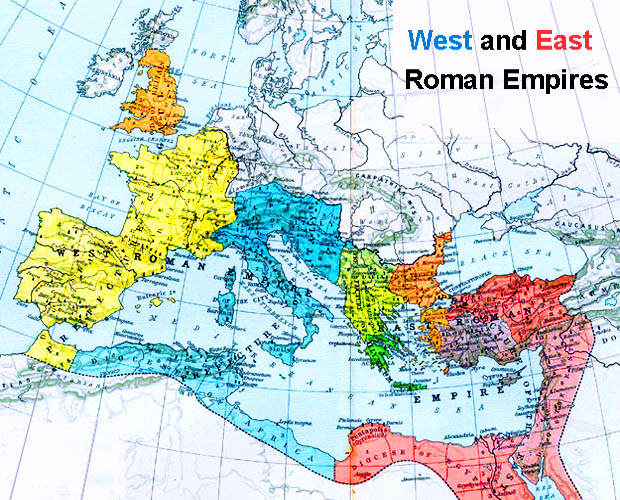
Harold Innis noted that papyrus documents enabled Rome to administer its huge empire.

=== Empire, bias and balance ===
In his introduction, Innis promises to examine the significance of communications in a small number of empires. "The effective government of large areas," he writes, "depends to a very important extent on the efficiency of communication." He argues for example, that light and easily transported papyrus enabled Rome to govern a large, centralized empire. For Innis, papyrus is associated with the political and administrative control of space. It, therefore, is a space-biased medium. Parchment, dominant after the breakup of the Roman Empire, was a durable medium used for hand copying manuscripts in medieval monasteries. For Innis, parchment favours decentralization and is associated with the religious control of time. It, therefore, is a time-biased medium. Innis argues that in order to last, large-scale political organizations such as empires must balance biases toward time and space. "They have tended to flourish under conditions in which civilization reflects the influence of more than one medium and in which the bias of one medium towards decentralization is offset by the bias of another medium towards centralization."

=== Writing, printing, and speech ===
Innis divides the history of the empires and civilizations he will examine into two periods, one for writing and the other for printing. "In the writing period we can note the importance of various media such as the clay tablet of Mesopotamia, the papyrus roll in the Egyptian and in the Graeco-Roman world, parchment codex in the late Graeco-Roman world and the early Middle Ages, and paper after its introduction in the Western world from China." Innis notes that he will concentrate on paper as a medium in the printing period along with the introduction of paper-making machinery at the beginning of the 19th century and the use of wood pulp in the manufacture of paper after 1850.

He is quick to add, however, that it would be presumptuous to conclude that writing alone determined the course of civilizations. Historians naturally focus on writing because it endures. "We are apt to overlook the significance of the spoken word," he writes, "and to forget that it has left little tangible remains." For Innis, that tendency poses a problem. "It is scarcely possible for generations disciplined in the written and the printed tradition to appreciate the oral tradition." Therefore, the media biases of one civilization make understanding other peoples difficult, if not impossible.

"A change in the type of medium implies a change in the type of appraisal and hence makes it difficult for one civilization to understand another." As an example, Innis refers to our tendency to impose a modern conception of time on past civilizations. "With the dominance of arithmetic and the decimal system, dependent apparently on the number of fingers or toes, modern students have accepted the linear measure of time," he writes. "The dangers of applying this procrustean device in the appraisal of civilizations in which it did not exist illustrate one of numerous problems."

Innis also contrasts the strikingly different effects of writing and speaking. He argues that "writing as compared with speaking involves an impression at the second remove and reading an impression at the third remove. The voice of a second-rate person is more impressive than the published opinion of superior ability."

== Chapter 2. Egypt: From stone to papyrus ==
Harold Innis traces the evolution of ancient Egyptian dynasties and kingdoms in terms of their use of stone or papyrus as dominant media of communication. His outline of Egyptian civilization is a complex and highly detailed analysis of how these media, along with several other technologies, affected the distribution of power in society.

=== Influence of the Nile ===
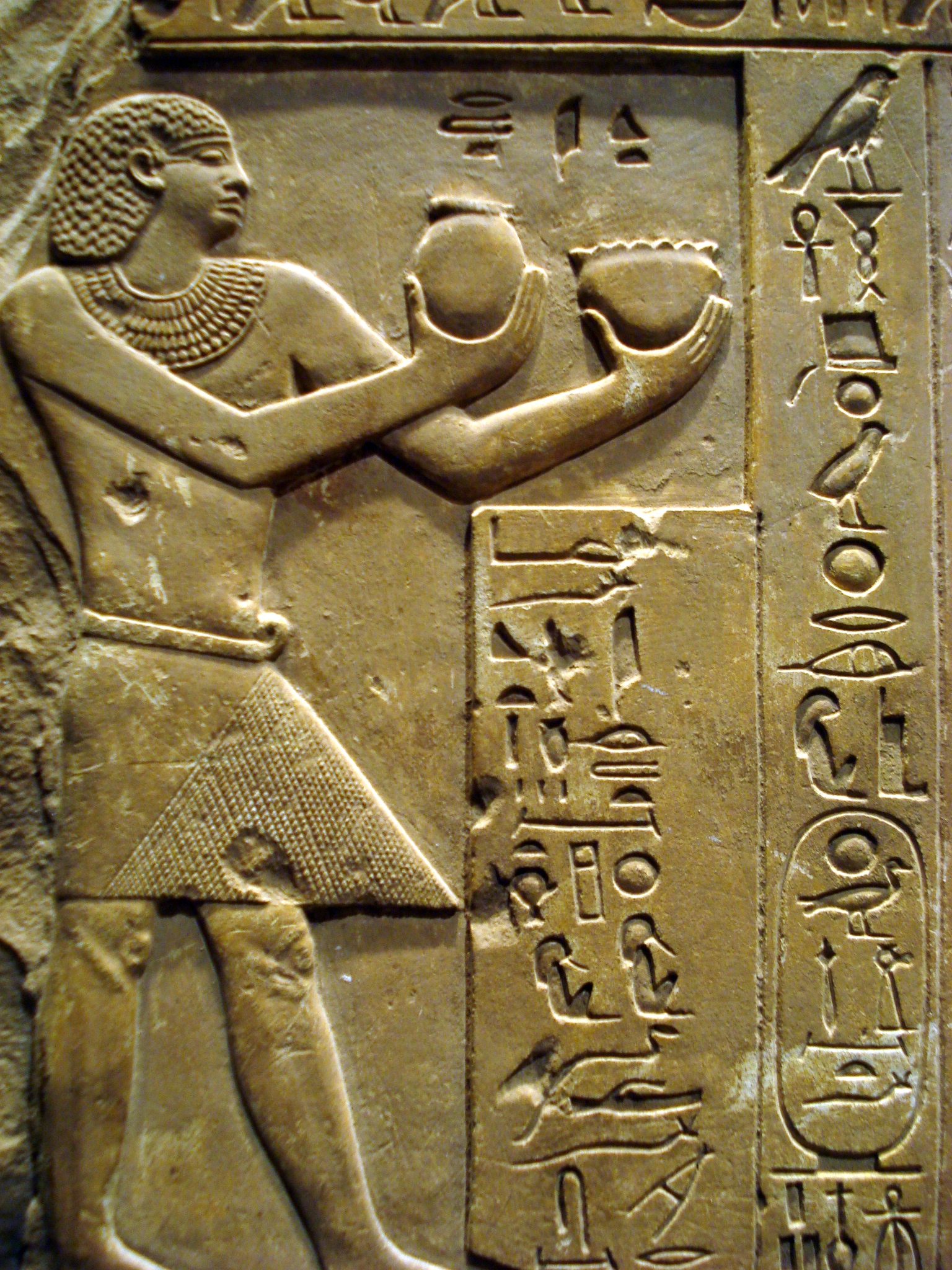
A funerary stele from ancient Egypt's Middle Kingdom. Innis believed that hieroglyphics engraved in stone originally perpetuated the divine power of Egyptian kings.

Innis begins, as other historians do, with the crucial importance of the Nile as a formative influence on Egyptian civilization. The river provided the water and fertile land needed for agricultural production in a desert region. Innis writes that the Nile therefore, "acted as a principle of order and centralization, necessitated collective work, created solidarity, imposed organizations on the people, and cemented them in a society." This observation is reminiscent of Innis's earlier work on the economic influence of waterways and other geographical features in his book, The Fur Trade in Canada, first published in 1930. However, in Empire and Communications, Innis extends his economic analysis to explore the influence of the Nile on religion, associating the river with the sun god Ra, creator of the universe. In a series of intellectual leaps, Innis asserts that Ra's power was vested in an absolute monarch whose political authority was reinforced by specialized astronomical knowledge. Such knowledge was used to produce the calendar which could predict the Nile's yearly floods.

=== Stone, hieroglyphics and absolute monarchs ===
As the absolute monarchy extended its influence over Egypt, a pictorial hieroglyphic writing system was invented to express the idea of royal immortality. According to Innis, the idea of the divine right of autocratic monarchs was developed from 2895 BC to 2540 BC. "The pyramids," Innis writes, "carried with them the art of pictorial representation as an essential element of funerary ritual." The written word on the tomb, he asserts, perpetuated the divine power of kings.

Innis suggests that the decline of the absolute monarchy after 2540 BC may have been related to the need for a more accurate calendar based on the solar year. He suggests that priests may have developed such a calendar increasing their power and authority. After 2000 BC, peasants, craftsmen, and scribes obtained religious and political rights. "The profound disturbances in Egyptian civilization," Innis writes "involved in the shift from absolute monarchy to more democratic organization coincided with a shift in emphasis on stone as a medium of communication or as a basis of prestige, as shown in the pyramids, to an emphasis on papyrus."

=== Papyrus and the power of scribes ===
Innis traces the influence of the newer medium of papyrus on political power in ancient Egypt. The growing use of papyrus led to the replacement of cumbersome hieroglyphic scripts by cursive or hieratic writing. Rapid writing styles made administration more efficient and highly trained scribes became part of a privileged civil service. Innis writes. however, that the replacement of one dominant medium by another led to upheaval.

The shift from dependence on stone to dependence on papyrus and the changes in political and religious institutions imposed an enormous strain on Egyptian civilization. Egypt quickly succumbed to invasion from peoples equipped with new instruments of attack. Invaders with the sword and the bow and long-range weapons broke through Egyptian defence, dependent on the battle-axe and the dagger. With the use of bronze and possibly iron weapons, horses and chariots, Syrian Semitic peoples under the Hyksos or Shepherd kings captured and held Egypt from 1660 to 1580 BC.

Hyksos rule lasted about a century until the Egyptians drove them out. Innis writes that the invaders had adopted hieroglyphic writing and Egyptian customs, "but complexity enabled the Egyptians to resist." The Egyptians may have won their victory using horses and light chariots acquired from the Libyans.

=== Empire and the one true god ===
Innis writes that the military organization that expelled the Hyksos enabled the Egyptians to establish and expand an empire that included Syria and Palestine, and that eventually reached the Euphrates. Egyptian administrators used papyrus and a postal service to run the empire, but adopted cuneiform as a more efficient script. The pharaoh Akhnaton tried to introduce Aten, the solar disk as the one true god, a system of worship that would provide a common ideal for the whole empire. But the priests and the people resisted "a single cult in which duty to the empire was the chief consideration." Priestly power, Innis writes, resulted from religious control over the complex and difficult art of writing. The monarch's attempts to maintain an empire extended in space were defeated by a priestly monopoly over knowledge systems concerned with time --- systems that began with the need for accurate predictions about when the Nile would overflow its banks. Innis argues that priestly theocracy gradually cost Egypt its empire. "Monopoly over writing supported an emphasis on religion and the time concept, which defeated efforts to solve the problem of space."

== Chapter 3. Babylonia: The origins of writing ==
In this chapter, Innis outlines the history of the world's first civilizations in Mesopotamia. He starts with the fertile plains between the Tigris and Euphrates rivers, but as the history unfolds, his discussion extends to large parts of the modern Middle East. Innis traces the origins of writing from the cuneiform script written on clay tablets to the Phoenician alphabet written on parchment and papyrus. Along the way, Innis comments on many aspects of the ancient Middle Eastern empires including power struggles between priests and kings, the evolution of military technologies and the development of the Hebrew Bible.

=== History begins at Sumer ===
Innis begins by observing that unlike in Egypt where calculating the timing of the Nile's flooding was a source of power, along the Tigris and Euphrates rivers in southern Mesopotamia the ability to measure time precisely was somewhat less critical. Nevertheless, as in Egypt, the small city-states of Sumer depended on the rivers and so the cycles of agricultural production were organized around them. The rivers also provided communications materials. In Egypt, the Nile's papyrus became a medium for writing while in Mesopotamia, the rivers yielded the alluvial sediments the Sumerians used to fashion the clay tablets on which they inscribed their wedge-shaped, cuneiform script. Their earliest known writing recorded agricultural accounts and economic transactions.

Innis points out that the tablets were not well suited to pictographic writing because making straight lines "tended to pull up the clay." Therefore, Sumerian scribes used a cylindrical reed stylus to stamp or press wedges and lines on the moist tablet. Scribes gradually developed cuneiform signs to represent syllables and the sounds of the spoken language. Innis writes that as a heavy material, clay was not very portable and so was not generally suited for communication over large areas. Cuneiform inscription required years of training overseen by priests. Innis contends therefore, that as a writing medium, clay tended to favour decentralization and religious control.

=== From city-states to empires ===
Innis suggests that religious control in Sumer became a victim of its own successes. "The accumulation of wealth and power in the hands of priests and the temple organizations," he writes, "was probably followed by ruthless warfare between city-states." The time-bound priests, unskilled in technological change and the military arts, lost power to spatially oriented kings intent on territorial expansion. Around 2350 BC, the Sumerians were conquered by their northern, Semitic neighbours the Akkadians. Under Sargon the Great, the empire expanded to include extensive territories reaching northwest as far as Turkey and west to the Mediterranean. Thus begins the rise and fall of a series of empires over approximately two thousand years. Innis mentions many of them, but focuses more attention on innovations that facilitated their growth. These include the advancement of civil law under Hammurabi, the development of mathematics including fixed standards of weights and measures, as well as the breeding of horses that combined speed with strength and that, along with three-man chariots, helped deliver spectacular military victories to the Assyrians.

=== Alphabet, empire and trade ===
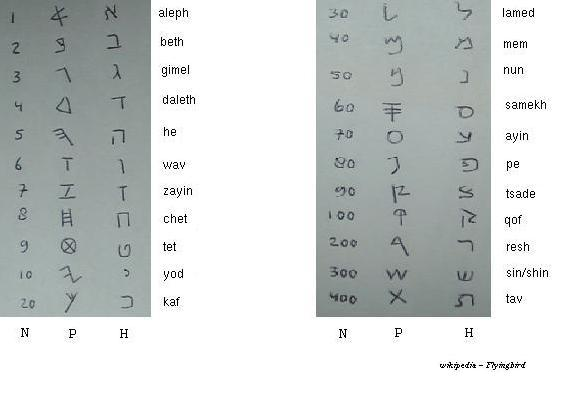
The Phoenician alphabet. The Phoenicians were sailors and traders who travelled widely taking their versatile alphabet with them.

In discussing the advent and spread of the alphabet, Innis refers to what he sees as the subversive relationship between those at the centre of civilizations and those on their fringes or margins. He argues that monopolies of knowledge develop at the centre only to be challenged and eventually overthrown by new ideas or techniques that take shape on the margins. Thus, the Phoenician alphabet, a radically simplified writing system, undermined the elaborate hieroglyphic and cuneiform scripts overseen by priestly elites in Egypt and Babylonia. "The Phoenicians had no monopoly of knowledge," Innis writes, "[which] might hamper the development of writing." As a trading people, the Phoenicians needed "a swift and concise method of recording transactions." The alphabet with its limited number of visual symbols to represent the primary elements of human speech was well suited to trade. "Commerce and the alphabet were inextricably interwoven, particularly when letters of the alphabet were used as numerals." The alphabet, combined with the use of parchment and papyrus, Innis argues, had a decentralizing effect favouring cities and smaller nations over centralized empires. He suggests that improved communication, made possible by the alphabet, enabled the Assyrians and the Persians to administer large empires in which trading cities helped offset concentrations of power in political and religious organizations.

=== Alphabet, the Hebrews and religion ===
Innis sketches the influence of the alphabet on the Hebrews in the marginal territory of Palestine. The Hebrews combined oral and written traditions in their scriptures. Innis points out that they had previously acquired key ideas from the Egyptians. "The influence of Egypt on the Hebrews," he writes, "was suggested in the emphasis on the sacred character of writing and on the power of the word which when uttered brought about creation itself. The word is the word of wisdom. Word, wisdom, and God were almost identical theological concepts." The Hebrews distrusted images. For them, words were the true source of wisdom. "The written letter replaced the graven image as an object of worship." In a typically complex passage, Innis writes:

"Denunciation of images and concentration on the abstract in writing opened the way for advance from blood relationship to universal ethical standards and strengthened the position of the prophets in their opposition to absolute monarchical power. The abhorrence of idolatry of graven images implied a sacred power in writing, observance of the law, and worship of the one true God."

The alphabet enabled the Hebrews to record their rich oral tradition in poetry and prose. "Hebrew has been described as the only Semitic language before Arabic to produce an important literature characterized by simplicity, vigour and lyric force. With other Semitic languages it was admirably adapted to the vivid, vigorous description of concrete objects and events." Innis traces the influence of various strands in scriptural writing suggesting that the combination of these sources strengthened the movement toward monotheism.

In a summary passage, Innis explores the wide-ranging influence of the alphabet in ancient times. He argues that it enabled the Assyrians and Persians to expand their empires, allowed for the growth of trade under the Arameans and Phoenicians and invigorated religion in Palestine. As such, the alphabet provided a balance. "An alphabet became the basis of political organization through efficient control of territorial space and of religious organization through efficient control over time in the establishment of monotheism."

== Chapter 4. Greece and the oral tradition ==
"Greek civilization," Innis writes, "was a reflection of the power of the spoken word." In this chapter, he explores how the vitality of the spoken word helped the ancient Greeks create a civilization that profoundly influenced all of Europe. Greek civilization differed in significant ways from the empires of Egypt and Babylonia. Innis biographer John Watson notes that those preceding empires "had revolved around an uneasy alliance of absolute monarchs and scholarly theocrats." The monarchs ruled by force while an elite priestly class controlled religious dogma through their monopolies of knowledge over complex writing systems. "The monarch was typically a war leader whose grasp of the concept of space allowed him to expand his territory," Watson writes, "incorporating even the most highly articulated theocracies. The priests specialized in elaborating conceptions of time and continuity." Innis argues that the Greeks struck a different balance, one based on "the freshness and elasticity of an oral tradition" that left its stamp on Western poetry, drama, sculpture, architecture, philosophy, science and mathematics.

=== Socrates, Plato and the spoken word ===
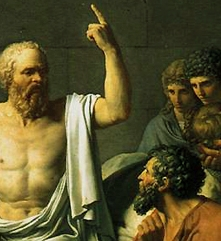
Detail of the painting The Death of Socrates by Jacques-Louis David

Innis begins by examining Greek civilization at its height in the 5th century BC. He points out that the philosopher Socrates (c. 470 BC–399 BC) "was the last great product and exponent of the oral tradition." Socrates taught using a question and answer technique that produced discussion and debate. His student, Plato (428/427 BC – 348/347 BC), elaborated on these Socratic conversations by writing dialogues in which Socrates was the central character. This dramatic device engaged readers in the debate while allowing Plato to search for truth using a dialectical method or one based on discussion. "The dialogues were developed," Innis writes "as a most effective instrument for preserving [the] power of the spoken word on the written page." He adds that Plato's pupil, Aristotle (384 BC – 322 BC), regarded the Platonic dialogues as "half-way between poetry and prose." Innis argues that Plato's use of the flexible oral tradition in his writing enabled him to escape the confines of a rigid philosophical system. "Continuous philosophical discussion aimed at truth. The life and movement of dialectic opposed the establishment of a finished system of dogma." This balance between speech and prose also contributed to the immortality of Plato's work.

Innis writes that the power of the oral tradition reached its height in the tragedies of Aeschylus, Sophocles and Euripides when "drama became the expression of Athenian democracy." He argues that tragedy attracted the interest and participation of everyone. "To know oneself was to know man's powerlessness and to know the indestructible and conquering majesty of suffering humanity."

For Innis, the fall of Athens to Sparta in 404 BC and the trial and execution of Socrates for corrupting Athenian youth were symptoms of the collapse of the older oral culture. That culture had sustained a long poetic tradition, but Plato attacked poetry as a teaching device and expelled poets from his ideal republic. According to Innis, Plato and Aristotle developed prose in defence of a new culture in which gods and poets were subordinated to philosophical and scientific inquiry. Innis argues that eventually, the spread of writing widened the gap between the city-states hastening the collapse of Greek civilization.

=== The Greek alphabet ===
Innis notes that the early Mycenaean Greeks of the Bronze Age developed their own styles of communication because they escaped the cultural influence of the Minoans they had conquered on the island of Crete. "The complexity of the script of Minoan civilization and its relative restriction to Crete left the Greeks free to develop their own traditions." Innis adds that the growth of a strong oral tradition reflected in Greek epic poetry also fostered resistance to the dominance of other cultures. This led the Greeks to take over and modify the Phoenician alphabet possibly around the beginning of the 7th century BC. The Greeks adapted this 24-letter, Semitic alphabet which consisted only of consonants to their rich oral tradition by using some of its letters to represent vowel sounds. Innis writes that the vowels in each written word "permitted the expression of fine distinctions and light shades of meaning." The classics professor, Eric Havelock, whose work influenced Innis, makes a similar point when he argues that this alphabet enabled the Greeks to record their oral literary tradition with a "wealth of detail and depth of psychological feeling" absent in other Near Eastern civilizations with more limited writing systems. Innis himself quotes scholar Richard Jebb's claim that the Greek language "'responds with happy elasticity to every demand of the Greek intellect...the earliest work of art created by the spontaneous working of the Greek mind.'"

=== Poetry, politics and the oral tradition ===
"The power of the oral tradition," Innis writes, "implied the creation of a structure suited to its needs." That structure consisted of the metres and stock phrases of epic poetry which included the Homeric poems, the Iliad and Odyssey. The epics were sung by professional minstrels who pleased audiences by reshaping the poems to meet the needs of new generations. Innis points out that music was central to the oral tradition and the lyre accompanied the performance of the epic poems. He argues that the Homeric poems reflected two significant developments. The first was the rise of an aristocratic civilization which valued justice and right action over the traditional ties of kinship. The second was the humanization of the Greek gods whose limited powers encouraged belief in rational explanations for the order of things. "Decline of belief in the supernatural led to the explanation of nature in terms of natural causes," Innis writes. "With the independent search for truth, science was separated from myth."

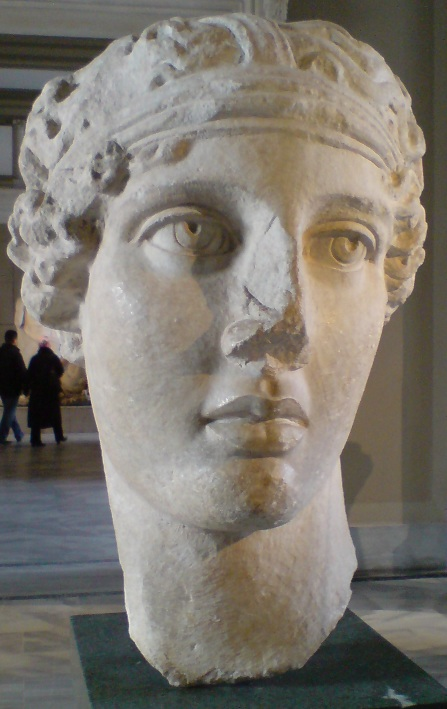
Head of the poet Sappho

Gradually, the flexible oral tradition gave rise to other kinds of poetry. Innis notes that these new kinds of literature "reflected the efficiency of the oral tradition in expressing the needs of social change." Hesiod wrote about agricultural themes, becoming the first spokesman for common people. Innis writes that his poems were produced "by an individual who made no attempt to conceal his personality." In the 7th century BC, Archilochos took poetry a step further when he contributed to breaking down the heroic code of epic poetry. Innis suggests he responded to a rising public opinion while historian J.B. Bury describes him as venting his feelings freely and denouncing his enemies. Innis argues that these changes in poetic style and form coincided with the replacement of Greek kingdoms by republics in the 8th and 7th centuries BC. Finally, he mentions the development of shorter, lyric poetry that could be intensely personal as shown in the work of Sappho. This profusion of short personal lyrics likely coincided with the spread of writing and the increasing use of papyrus from Egypt.

=== Greek science and philosophy ===
Innis credits the oral tradition with fostering the rise of Greek science and philosophy. He argues that when combined with the simplicity of the alphabet, the oral tradition prevented the development of a highly specialized class of scribes and a priestly monopoly over education. Moreover, unlike the Hebrews, the Greeks did not develop written religious texts. "The Greeks had no Bible with a sacred literature attempting to give reasons and coherence to the scheme of things, making dogmatic assertions and strangling science in infancy." Innis contends that the flexibility of the oral tradition encouraged the introduction of a new medium, mathematics. Thales of Miletus may have discovered trigonometry. He also studied geometry and astronomy, using mathematics as "a means of discarding allegory and myth and advancing universal generalizations." Thus, mathematics gave rise to philosophical speculation. The map maker, Anaximander also sought universal truths becoming "the first to write down his thoughts in prose and to publish them, thus definitely addressing the public and giving up the privacy of his thought." According to Innis, this use of prose "reflected a revolutionary break, an appeal to rational authority and the influence of the logic of writing."

== Chapter 5. Rome and the written tradition ==
In this chapter, Harold Innis focuses on the gradual displacement of oral communication by written media during the long history of the Roman Empire. The spread of writing hastened the downfall of the Roman Republic, he argues, facilitating the emergence of a Roman Empire stretching from Britain to Mesopotamia. To administer such a vast empire, the Romans were forced to establish centralized bureaucracies. These bureaucracies depended on supplies of cheap papyrus from the Nile Delta for the long-distance transmission of written rules, orders and procedures. The bureaucratic Roman state backed by the influence of writing, in turn, fostered absolutism, the form of government in which power is vested in a single ruler. Innis adds that Roman bureaucracy destroyed the balance between oral and written law giving rise to fixed, written decrees. The torture of Roman citizens and the imposition of capital punishment for relatively minor crimes became common as living law "was replaced by the dead letter." Finally, Innis discusses the rise of Christianity, a religion which spread through the use of scripture inscribed on parchment. He writes that the Byzantine Empire in the east eventually flourished because of a balance in media biases. Papyrus enabled the governing of a large spatial empire, while parchment contributed to the development of a religious hierarchy concerned with time.

=== Rome and Greece ===
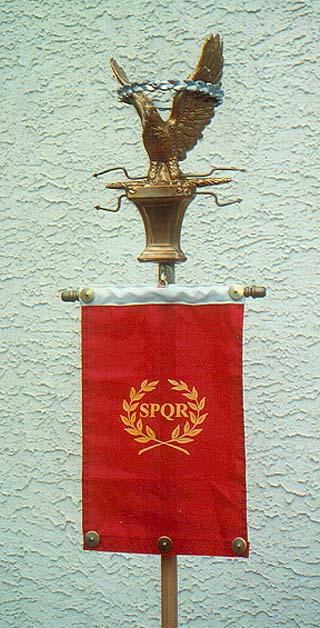
The initials SPQR stood for Senātus Populusque Rōmānus ("The Senate and the People of Rome"). They were emblazoned on the banners of Roman legions.

"The achievements of a rich oral tradition in Greek civilization," Innis writes, "became the basis of Western culture." He asserts that Greek culture had the power "to awaken the special forces of each people by whom it was adopted" and the Romans were no exception. According to Innis, it appears Greek colonies in Sicily and Italy along with Greek traders introduced the Greek alphabet to Rome in the 7th century BC. The alphabet was developed into a Graeco-Etruscan script when Rome was governed by an Etruscan king. The Etruscans also introduced Greek gods in the 6th century BC apparently to reinforce their own rule. Rome became isolated from Greece in the 5th and 4th centuries BC and overthrew the monarchy. A patrician aristocracy took control, but after prolonged class warfare, gradually shared power with the plebeians. Innis suggests that Roman law flourished at this time because of its oral tradition. A priestly class, "equipped with trained memories," made and administered the laws, their power strengthened because there was no body of written law. Although plebeian pressure eventually resulted in the adoption of the Twelve Tables—a written constitution—interpretation remained in the hands of priests in the College of Pontiffs. One of Roman law's greatest achievements, Innis writes, lay in the development of civil laws governing families, property and contracts. Paternal rights were limited, women became independent and individual initiative was given the greatest possible scope.

Innis seems to suggest that political stability coupled with strong oral traditions in law and religion contributed to the unity of the Roman Republic. He warns however, that the growing influence of written laws, treaties and decrees in contrast to the oral tradition of civil law "boded ill for the history of the republic and the empire."

Innis quickly sketches the Roman conquest of Italy and its three wars with the North African city of Carthage. The Punic Wars ended with the destruction of Carthage in 146 BC. At the same time, Rome pursued military expansion in the eastern Mediterranean eventually conquering Macedonia and Greece as well as extending Roman rule to Pergamum in modern-day Turkey.

=== Rome and the problems of Greek empire ===
Innis interrupts his account of Roman military expansion to discuss earlier problems that had arisen from the Greek conquests undertaken by Philip of Macedon and his son, Alexander the Great. Philip and Alexander had established a Macedonian Empire which controlled the Persian Empire as well as territory as far east as India. Innis suggests Rome would inherit the problems that faced Philip and Alexander including strong separatist tendencies. After Alexander's death, four separate Hellenistic dynasties arose. The Seleucids controlled the former Persian Empire; the Ptolemies ruled in Egypt; the Attalids in Pergamum and the Antigonids in Macedonia.

==== Seleucid dynasty ====
The Seleucid rulers attempted to dominate Persian, Babylonian and Hebrew religions but failed to establish the concept of the Greek city-state. Their kingdom eventually collapsed. Innis concludes that monarchies that lack the binding powers of nationality and religion and that depend on force were inherently insecure, unable to resolve dynastic problems.

==== Ptolemaic dynasty ====
Innis discusses various aspects of Ptolemaic rule over Egypt including the founding of the ancient library and university at Alexandria made possible by access to abundant supplies of papyrus. "By 285 BC the library established by Ptolemy I had 20,000 manuscripts," Innis writes, "and by the middle of the first century 700,000, while a smaller library established by Ptolemy II...possibly for duplicates had 42,800." He points out that the power of the written tradition in library and university gave rise to specialists, not poets and scholars — drudges who corrected proofs and those who indulged in the mania of book collecting. "Literature was divorced from life, thought from action, poetry from philosophy." Innis quotes the epic poet Apollonius's claim that "a great book was a great evil." Cheap papyrus also facilitated the rise of an extensive administrative system eventually rife with nepotism and other forms of bureaucratic corruption. "An Egyptian theocratic state," Innis notes, "compelled its conquerors to establish similar institutions designed to reduce its power."

==== Attalid dynasty ====
Innis contrasts the scholarly pursuits of the Attalid dynasty at Pergamum with what he sees as the dilettantism of Alexandria. He writes that Eumenes II who ruled from 197 to 159 BC established a library, but was forced to rely on parchment because Egypt had prohibited the export of papyrus to Pergamum. Innis suggests that the Attalids probably preserved the masterpieces of ancient Greek prose. He notes that Pergamum had shielded a number of cities from attacks by the Gauls. "Its art reflected the influence of the meeting of civilization and barbarism, a conflict of good and evil, in the attempt at unfamiliar ways of expression."

==== Antigonid dynasty ====
Innis writes that the Antigonids "gradually transformed the small city-states of Greece into municipalities." They captured Athens in 261 BC and Sparta in 222 BC. The Greek cities of this period developed common interests. "With supplies of papyrus and parchment and the employment of educated slaves," Innis writes, "books were produced on an unprecedented scale. Hellenistic capitals provided a large reading public." Most of the books, however, were "third-hand compendia of snippets and textbooks, short cuts to knowledge, quantities of tragedies, and an active comedy of manners in Athens. Literary men wrote books about other books and became bibliophiles." Innis reports that by the 2nd century "everything had been swamped by the growth of rhetoric." He argues that once classical Greek philosophy "became crystallized in writing," it was superseded by an emphasis on philosophical teaching. He mentions Stoicism, the Cynics and Epicurean teachings all of which emphasized the priority of reason over popular religion. "The Olympian religion and the city-state were replaced by philosophy and science for the educated and by Eastern religions for the common man." As communication between these two groups became increasingly difficult, cultural division stimulated the rise of a class structure. Innis concludes that the increasing emphasis on writing also created divisions among Athens, Alexandria and Pergamum weakening science and philosophy and opening "the way to religions from the East and force from Rome in the West."

=== Greek influence and Roman prose ===
Innis returns to his account of Roman history by noting that Rome's military successes in the eastern Mediterranean brought it under the direct influence of Greek culture. He quotes the Roman poet Horace: "Captive Greece took captive her proud conqueror." Innis gives various examples of Greek influence in Rome. They include the introduction of Greek tragedies and comedies at Roman festivals to satisfy the demands of soldiers who had served in Greek settlements as well as the translation of the Odyssey into Latin.

Innis mentions there was strong opposition to this spread of Greek culture. He reports for example, that Cato the Elder deplored what he saw as the corrupting effects of Greek literature. Cato responded by laying the foundations for a dignified and versatile Latin prose. In the meantime, the Roman Senate empowered officials to expel those who taught rhetoric and philosophy and in 154 BC, two disciples of Epicurus were banished from Rome. Nevertheless, Innis points out that Greek influence continued as "Greek teachers and grammarians enhanced the popularity of Hellenistic ideals in literature."

Meantime, Innis asserts, Roman prose "gained fresh power in attempts to meet problems of the Republic." He is apparently referring to the vast enrichment of the Roman aristocracy and upper middle class as wealth poured in from newly conquered provinces. "The plunder from the provinces provided the funds for that orgy of corrupt and selfish wealth which was to consume the Republic in revolution," writes Will Durant in his series of volumes called The Story of Civilization. Innis mentions that the large-scale farms owned by aristocrats brought protests presumably from small farmers forced off the land and into the cities as part of a growing urban proletariat. The Gracchi brothers were among the first, Innis writes, "to use the weapon of Greek rhetoric" in their failed attempts to secure democratic reforms. Gaius Gracchus made Latin prose more vivid and powerful. Innis adds that political speeches such as his "were given wider publicity through an enlarged circle of readers." As political oratory shaped Latin prose style, written speech almost equaled the power of oral speech.

=== Writing, empire and religion ===
Rome's dominance of Egypt, Innis writes, gave it access to papyrus which supported a chain of interrelated developments that would eventually lead to the decline and fall of Rome. Papyrus facilitated the spread of writing which in turn, permitted the growth of bureaucratic administration needed to govern territories that would eventually stretch from Britain to Mesopotamia. "The spread of writing contributed to the downfall of the Republic and the emergence of the empire," Innis writes.

Roman Colosseum, symbol of permanence

Centralized administrative bureaucracy helped create the conditions for the emergence of absolute rulers such as the Caesars which, in turn, led to emperor worship. According to Innis, the increased power of writing touched every aspect of Roman culture including law which became rigidly codified and increasingly reliant on such harsh measures as torture and capital punishment even for relatively trivial crimes. "The written tradition dependent on papyrus and the roll supported an emphasis on centralized bureaucratic administration," Innis writes. "Rome became dependent on the army, territorial expansion, and law at the expense of trade and an international economy."

Innis notes that Rome attempted to increase its imperial prestige by founding libraries. And, with the discovery of cement about 180 BC, the Romans constructed magnificent buildings featuring arch, vault and dome. "Vaulted architecture became an expression of equilibrium, stability, and permanence, monuments which persisted through centuries of neglect."

Innis argues that the gradual rise of Christianity from its origins as a Jewish sect among lower social strata on the margins of empire was propelled by the development of the parchment codex, a much more convenient medium than cumbersome papyrus rolls. "The oral tradition of Christianity was crystallized in books which became sacred," Innis writes. He adds that after breaking away from Judaism, Christianity was forced to reach out to other religions, its position strengthened further by scholars who attempted to synthesize Jewish religion and Greek philosophy in the organization of the Church.

Constantine ended official persecution of Christianity and moved the imperial capital to Constantinople eventually creating a religious split between the declining Western Roman Empire and believers in the East. "As the power of empire was weakened in the West that of the Church of Rome increased and difficulties with heresies in the East became more acute." Innis contends the Eastern or Byzantine Empire survived after the fall of Rome because it struck a balance between time and space-biased media. "The Byzantine empire developed on the basis of a compromise between organization reflecting the bias of different media: that of papyrus in the development of an imperial bureaucracy in relation to a vast area and that of parchment in the development of an ecclesiastical hierarchy in relation to time."

== Chapter 6. Middle Ages: Parchment and paper ==
In Chapter 6, Innis tries to show how the medium of parchment supported the power of churches, clergy and monasteries in medieval Europe after the breakdown of the Roman empire. Rome's centralized administration had depended on papyrus, a fragile medium produced in the Nile Delta. Innis notes that parchment, on the other hand, is a durable medium that can be produced wherever farm animals are raised. He argues, therefore, that parchment is suited to the decentralized administration of a wide network of local religious institutions. However, the arrival of paper via China and the Arab world, challenged the power of religion and its preoccupation with time. "A monopoly of knowledge based on parchment," Innis writes, "invited competition from a new medium such as paper which emphasized the significance of space as reflected in the growth of nationalist monarchies." He notes that paper also facilitated the growth of commerce and trade in the 13th century.

=== Monasteries and books ===
Innis writes that monasticism originated in Egypt and spread rapidly partly in protest against Caesaropapism or the worldly domination of the early Christian church by emperors. He credits St. Benedict with adapting monasticism to the needs of the Western church. The Rule of St. Benedict required monks to engage in spiritual reading. Copying books and storing them in monastery libraries soon became sacred duties. Innis notes that copying texts on parchment required strength and effort:

Working six hours a day the scribe produced from two to four pages and required from ten months to a year and a quarter to copy a Bible. The size of the scriptures absorbed the energies of monasteries. Libraries were slowly built up and uniform rules in the care of books were generally adopted in the 13th century. Demands for space led to the standing of books upright on the shelves in the 14th and 15th centuries and to the rush of library construction in the 15th century.

Innis points out that Western monasteries preserved and transmitted the classics of the ancient world.

=== Islam, images, and Christianity ===
Innis writes that Islam (which he sometimes refers to as Mohammedanism) gathered strength by emphasizing the sacredness of the written word. He notes that the Caliph Iezid II ordered the destruction of pictures in Christian churches within the Umayyad Empire. The banning of icons within churches was also sanctioned by Byzantine Emperor Leo III in 730 while Emperor Constantine V issued a decree in 753–754 condemning image worship. Innis writes that this proscription of images was designed to strengthen the empire partly by curbing the power of monks, who relied on images to sanction their authority. Monasteries, he notes, had amassed large properties through their exemption from taxation and competed with the state for labour. Byzantine emperors reacted by secularizing large monastic properties, restricting the number of monks, and causing persecution, which drove large numbers of them to Italy.

The Western church, on the other hand, saw images as useful especially for reaching the illiterate. Innis adds that by 731, iconoclasts were excluded from the Church and Charles Martel's defeat of the Arabs in 732 ended Muslim expansion in western Europe. The Synod of Gentilly (767), the Lateran Council (769), and the Second Council of Nicea (787), sanctioned the use of images although Charlemagne prohibited image veneration or worship.

== Chapter 7. Mass media, from print to radio ==
In his final chapter, Harold Innis traces the rise of mass media beginning with the printing press in 15th century Europe and ending with mass circulation newspapers, magazines, books, movies and radio in the 19th and 20th centuries. He argues that such media gradually undermined the authority of religion and enabled the rise of science, facilitating Reformation, Renaissance and Revolution, political, industrial and commercial. For Innis, space-biased and mechanized mass media helped create modern empires, European and American, bent on territorial expansion and obsessed with present-mindedness. "Mass production and standardization are the enemies of the West," he warned. "The limitations of mechanization of the printed and the spoken word must be emphasized and determined efforts to recapture the vitality of the oral tradition must be made."

=== Bibles and the print revolution ===
Innis notes that the expense of producing hand-copied, manuscript Bibles on parchment invited lower-cost competition, especially in countries where the copyists' guild did not hold a strong monopoly. "In 1470 it was estimated in Paris that a printed Bible cost about one-fifth that of a manuscript Bible," Innis writes. He adds that the sheer size of the scriptures hastened the introduction of printing and that the flexibility of setting the limited number of alphabetic letters in type permitted small-scale, privately owned printing enterprises.

"By the end of the fifteenth century presses had been established in the larger centres of Europe," Innis writes. This led to a growing book trade as commercially minded printers reproduced various kinds of books including religious ones for the Church, medical and legal texts and translations from Latin and Greek. The Greek New Testament that Erasmus produced in 1516 became the basis for Martin Luther's German translation (1522) and William Tyndale's English version (1526). The rise in the numbers of Bibles and other books printed in native or vernacular languages contributed to the growth in the size or printing establishments and further undermined the influence of hand-copied, religious manuscripts. The printed word gained authority over the written one. Innis quotes historian W.E.H. Lecky: "The age of cathedrals had passed. The age of the printing press had begun."

Innis notes that Luther "took full advantage of an established book trade and large numbers of the New and later the Old Testament were widely distributed at low prices." Luther's attacks on the Catholic Church including his protests against the sale of indulgences, Canon law and the authority of the priesthood were widely distributed as pamphlets along with Luther's emphasis on St. Paul's doctrine of salvation through faith alone.

Monopolies of knowledge had developed and declined partly in relation to the medium of communication on which they were built, and tended to alternate as they emphasized religion, decentralization and time; or force, centralization, and space. Sumerian culture based on the medium of clay was fused with Semitic culture based on the medium of stone to produce the Babylonian empires. Egyptian civilization, based on a fusion of dependence on stone and dependence on papyrus, produced an unstable empire which eventually succumbed to religion. The Assyrian and Persian empires attempted to combine Egyptian and Babylonian civilization, and the latter succeeded with its appeal to toleration. Hebrew civilization emphasized the sacred character of writing in opposition to political organizations that emphasized the graven image. Greek civilization based on the oral tradition produced the powerful leaven that destroyed political empires. Rome assumed control over the medium on which Egyptian civilization had been based, and built up an extensive bureaucracy, but the latter survived in a fusion in the Byzantine Empire with Christianity based on the parchment codex. In the United States the dominance of the newspaper led to large-scale developments of monopolies of communication in terms of space and implied a neglect of problems of time...The bias of paper towards an emphasis on space and its monopolies of knowledge has been checked by the development of a new medium, the radio. The results have been evident in an increasing concern with problems of time, reflected in the growth of planning and the socialized state. The instability involved in dependence on the newspaper in the United States and the Western world has facilitated an appeal to force as a possible stabilizing factor. The ability to develop a system of government in which the bias of communication can be checked and an appraisal of the significance of space and time can be reached remains a problem of empire and of the Western world.

== Recent critical opinion ==
Innis's research findings, however dubiously achieved, put him far ahead of his time. Consider a paragraph written in 1948: "Formerly it required time to influence public opinion in favour of war. We have now reached the position in which opinion is systematically aroused and kept near boiling point.... [The] attitude [of the U.S.] reminds one of the stories of the fanatic fear of mice shown by elephants." Innis's was a dark vision because he saw the "mechanized" media as replacing ordinary face-to-face conversation. Such conversations since Socrates had helped equip free individuals to build free societies by examining many points of view. Instead we were to be increasingly dominated by a single point of view in print and electronic media: the view of the imperial centre. Would Innis have been cheered by the rise of the Internet and its millions of online conversations? Probably not. As Watson observes, the advent of the web is eradicating margins. The blogosphere simply multiplies the number of outlets for the same few messages. If we are to hope for new insights and criticism of the imperial centre, Watson says, we will have to turn to marginal groups: immigrants, women, gays, First Nations, francophones and Hispanics. They are as trapped in the imperial centre as the rest of us, but they still maintain a healthy alienation from the centre's self-referential follies. — Crawford Kilian

== See also ==
- Harold Innis's communications theories
- Monopolies of knowledge
- Time- and space-bias

== Bibliography ==
- Innis, Harold. (2007) Empire and Communications. Toronto: Dundurn Press. ISBN 978-1-55002-662-7
- Innis Harold. (1951) The Bias of Communication. Toronto: University of Toronto Press. OCLC 4128437
- Innis, Harold. (1970) The Fur Trade in Canada. Toronto: University of Toronto Press. ISBN 978-0-8020-6001-3
