= Alfred Majerowicz =

Polish geologist (1925–2018)

Alfred Majerowicz (31 July 1925 in Poznań – 2 November 2018) was a Polish geologist who was a lecturer at the University of Wrocław.

He was a founder of the Polish Mineralogical Society, and in 1996 he became its honorary member. In 1971–1972 he was a deputy director, in 1972–1975 he was the director of the Institute of Geological Sciences of the University of Wrocław.

His main scientific activity was petrology of crystalline rocks in Lower Silesia.

== Awards and decorations ==
- Badge of the Millenuim of the Polish State
- Gold Cross of Merit
- Knight's Cross of the Order of Polonia Restituta
- pl:Medal Komisji Edukacji Narodowej
- Gold pl:Medal Uniwersytetu Wrocławskiego
