= Monopolies of knowledge =

Power through control of communications

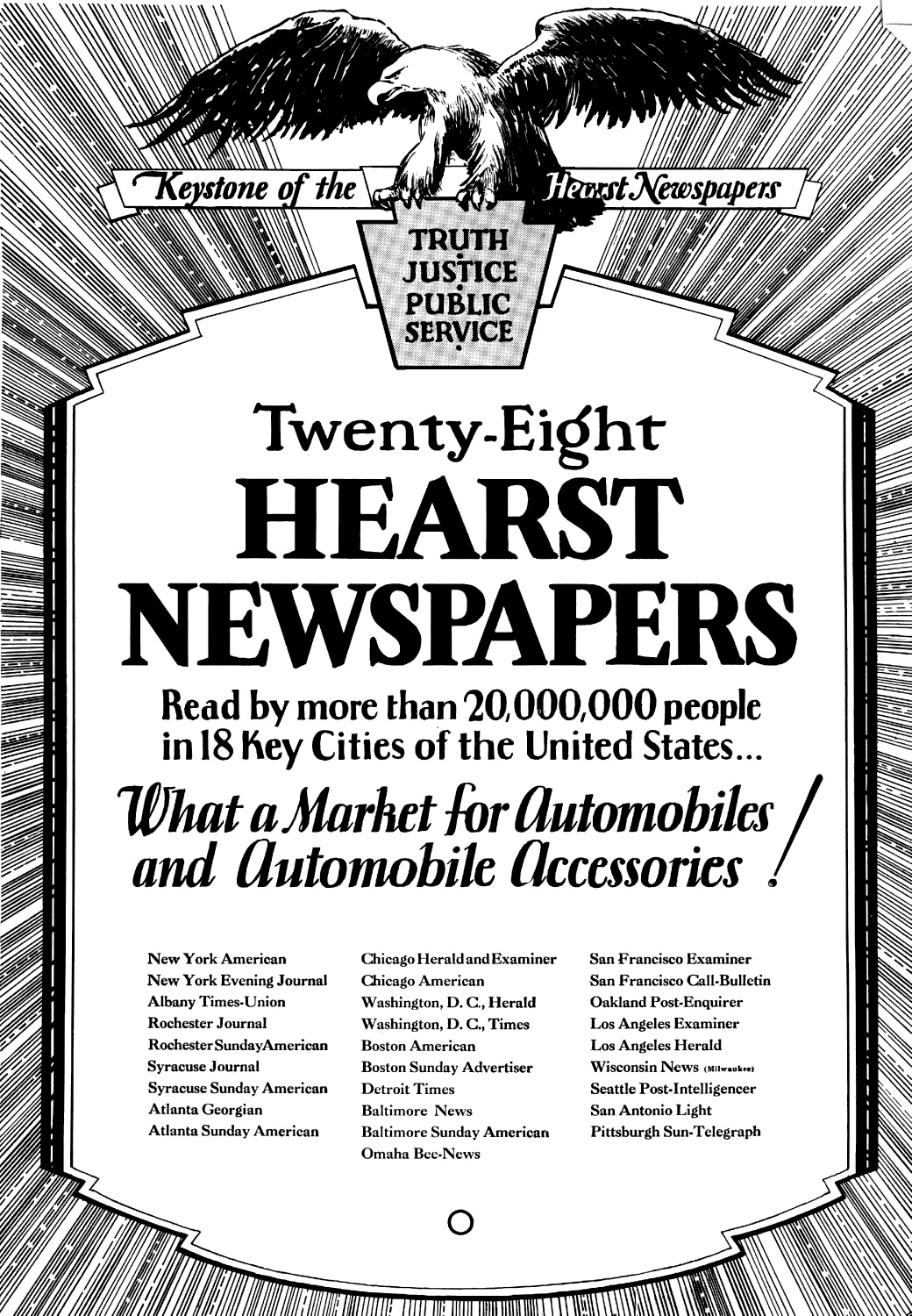
Innis pointed to the Hearst newspaper chain and its handful of powerful rivals as constituting a modern monopoly of knowledge.

Monopolies of knowledge arise when the ruling class maintains political power through control of key communications technologies. The Canadian economic historian Harold Innis developed the concept of monopolies of knowledge in his later writings on communications theories.

An example is given of ancient Egypt, where a complex writing system conferred a monopoly of knowledge on literate priests and scribes. Mastering the art of writing and reading required long periods of apprenticeship and instruction, confining knowledge to this powerful class. It is suggested that monopolies of knowledge gradually suppress new ways of thinking. Entrenched hierarchies become increasingly rigid and out of touch with social realities. Challenges to elite power are often likely to arise on the margins of society. The arts, for example, are often seen as a means of escape from the sterility of conformist thought.

In his later writings, Innis argued that industrialization and mass media had led to the mechanization of a culture in which more personal forms of oral communication were radically devalued. "Reading is quicker than listening," Innis wrote in 1948. "The printing press and the radio address the world instead of the individual."

We can look at the Internet as being a factor in creating knowledge monopolies. Those who have the skills to use the technology have the power to choose what information is communicated. The significance of the Internet in the creation of these monopolies, in more recent years, has been somewhat diminished due to increased knowledge and awareness of how to use the technology. At the same time, the ever-increasing complexity of digital technologies strengthens monopolies of knowledge, according to the New York Times:

[T]he Pentagon has commissioned military contractors to develop a highly classified replica of the Internet of the future. The goal is to simulate what it would take for adversaries to shut down the country’s power stations, telecommunications and aviation systems, or freeze the financial markets — in an effort to build better defenses against such attacks, as well as a new generation of online weapons.

Wherever new media arise, so too do monopolies of knowledge concerning how to use the technologies to reinforce the power and control of elite groups.

== Origins of the concept ==
When discussing the monopolies of knowledge, Innis focuses much of his concern on the United States, where he feared that mass-circulation newspapers and magazines along with privately owned broadcasting networks had undermined independent thought and local cultures and rendered audiences passive in the face of what he calls the "vast monopolies of communication". James W. Carey notes that Innis worried about the centralized control of information and entertainment by advertising-driven media. "The very existence of a commodity such as 'information' and an institution called 'media' make each other necessary," Carey writes. "More people spend more time dependent on the journalist, the publisher, and the program director. Every week they wait for Time [magazine]."

In order to fashion his concept of monopolies of knowledge, Innis drew on several fields of study, including economics, history, communications and technology.

=== Economics and the price system ===
In his 1938 essay, The Penetrative Powers of the Price System, Innis anticipates his later concept of monopolies of knowledge. Although he does not precisely define what he means by the "price system", he does show how trade and technology shaped modern industrial economies. Innis suggests, for example, that the shift from coal and iron to oil and electricity had profound implications that no one in industrial societies could escape. He mentions the growth of cities with people living in large apartment buildings made possible by developments in electrical equipment on the one hand, and the dispersal of populations over wide metropolitan areas as a result of the automobile and paved roads, on the other.

The inhabitants of modern industrial societies even eat differently than their more rural forebears. "The demands of population in congested areas, under the direction of scientific work in nutrition," Innis writes, "have shifted from carbohydrates to vitamins or from wheat to dairy products, live-stock, fruits and vegetables." At the same time, he adds, city dwellers are influenced by cheap, mass-circulation newspapers which peddle political stereotypes along with department store ads. For Innis, the industrial economy monopolizes how people live, work, communicate and think.

=== History and classical studies ===
Innis's concept of monopolies of knowledge was also influenced by the scholar Solomon Gandz who published a lengthy paper in 1939 on the significance of the oral tradition in the development of civilizations. Gandz advanced the idea that the control of language in the oral tradition was grounded in religious institutions which ensured a civilization's continuity by preserving its traditions. At the same time, however, religious elites often shared their power with political elites who controlled the use of military force, thereby ensuring a civilization's success in conquering and holding territory.

Innis incorporated these ideas in his concept of time-biased and space-biased media. He argued that civilizations and empires flourished when there was a balance between time- and space-biased media. The triumph of one type of medium over the other, however, undermined stability demonstrating that unbalanced monopolies of knowledge could gradually lead to the decline and fall of civilizations and empires. Innis argued this was, in fact, happening to Western civilization which had become dangerously unbalanced partly because of the monopoly of knowledge exercised by space-biased communications technologies such as the daily newspaper. For Innis, the newspaper reflected an obsession with what he termed "present-mindedness". Newspapers and the news agencies that served them could transmit large amounts of information over long distances, but this speed of transmission and the emphasis on immediacy obliterated continuity and memory. "Time," Innis wrote, "has been cut into pieces the length of a day's newspaper." The advent of electronic media—radio and later, television—added more speed and immediacy contributing cumulatively to the erasure of cultural memory. Moreover, these space-biased media could be used by political elites to mobilize large populations—as in Nazi Germany—to support disastrous wars of conquest.

== Significance of writing ==
Innis placed special emphasis on monopolies of knowledge that are based on the control of written media. "We can conveniently divide the history of the West into the writing and printing periods," he writes in Empire and Communications.

=== Writing ===
"The sword and the pen worked together," Innis writes. "The written record signed, sealed, and swiftly transmitted was essential to military power and the extension of government. Small communities were written into large states and states were consolidated into empire." Innis adds that the monarchies of Egypt and Persia as well as the Roman empire "were essentially products of writing."

Rome's adoption of papyrus facilitated the spread of writing and the growth of bureaucratic administration needed to govern vast territories. The efficiency of the alphabet strengthened monopolies of knowledge in a variety of ancient empires. Innis warns about the power of writing to create mental "grooves" which determine "the channels of thought of readers and later writers."

=== Printing and paper ===
Innis believed that the printing press was a decisive invention in the history of the West. Lewis Mumford pointed out that printing was "a completely mechanical achievement...the type for all future instruments of reproduction: for the printed sheet...was the first completely standardized product." Thus, for Innis, the printing press and the accompanying medium of paper ushered in not just the mechanization that would become characteristic of an industrial society based on mass production, but also the mechanization of knowledge itself. By that, Innis meant that printing led to the production of beliefs and practices that reinforced monopolies of knowledge characteristic of industrial culture.

An example of this can be seen in the large-scale production of newsprint in the 19th century that had far-reaching effects. Newsprint fostered the development of big newspaper plants that needed larger numbers of readers to deliver to big advertisers such as department stores. Department stores themselves reflected new ways of marketing to rising numbers of city dwellers. To attract more readers, newspaper proprietors began to run comics and to rely on the "excitement and sensationalism" of foreign wars. Such coverage influenced British and American foreign policies, sometimes disastrously.

Innis also warned that printed books could produce conformity of thought akin to the regimentation of workers in industrial factories. He repeats the Biblical commandment against worshiping graven images, but suggests that in our unconscious society, this prohibition is not interpreted to apply to the printed word.

According to William Kuhns, societies dominated by print media regard only printed knowledge as "essentially valid." Textbook publishers exert a huge influence on education at all levels while schools and universities refuse to accept knowledge in other than printed forms. "The monopoly of knowledge protects its own with wary vigilance," Kuhns writes. Or in Mumford's words, with the advent of the printed book, learning "became book-learning."

Paul Levinson writes that "[l]iteracy probably constitutes the most significant monopoly of knowledge in human history." He adds, however, that in open, democratic societies, public education systems are dedicated to breaking this monopoly by teaching students how to read and write, thereby giving them full access to printed knowledge.

== See also ==
- Concentration of media ownership
- Gleichschaltung
- State media
- Harold Innis's communications theories
- Empire and Communications
- Epistemology
- Mass media
- Media studies
- Power-knowledge
- Knowledge is power
