= Innes (disambiguation) =

Innes is a surname.

Innes may also refer to:

== Genealogy ==
- Clan Innes, clan
- Innes baronets, four baronetcies

== Geography ==
=== Places ===
Australia

- Glen Innes Severn Council, a local government area in New South Wales.
- Innes National Park, South Australia
  - Inneston, South Australia, a locality
- Innes Park, Queensland, a town

New Zealand

- Lake Innes, lake in the South Island

Elsewhere

- Innes Ward, city ward, Ottawa, Ontario, Canada
- Mount Innes-Taylor, Antarctica

=== In space ===
- Innes (crater), on the Moon
- 1658 Innes, an asteroid

=== Other ===
- Innes Road, Ottawa, Ontario, Canada
- The John Innes Centre, Norwich, Norfolk, England

== Other uses ==
- The Innes Book of Records, album by Neil Innes

== See also ==
- Glen Innes (disambiguation)
- Innis (disambiguation)
- Ennis (disambiguation)
- Ennes (disambiguation)
- Ines (disambiguation)
- Inne
