= Ennis (surname) =

Ennis is a surname of Irish and Scottish origin. The Irish surname is an Anglicized form of the Gaelic patronym Ò hAonghuis (descendant of Angus). The Scottish surname is a spelling variation of the surname Innes. The surname Eanes can also be a variation of "Ennis" or "McInnis". Notable people with the surname include:

== Arts and entertainment ==
- Andy Ennis (1938–2024), American jazz musician
- Catherine Ennis (1955–2020), British organist and music director
- Ethel Ennis (1932–2019), American jazz musician
- Garth Ennis (born 1970), Northern Irish comics writer
- George Pearse Ennis (1884–1936), American artist
- Helen Ennis, Australian curator, historian and critic of art
- Jacob Ennis (1728–1770), Irish artist
- Jessie Ennis, American actor
- John Ennis (actor) (born 1964), American actor
- John Ennis (artist) (born 1953), American artist
- John Ennis (poet) (born 1944), Irish poet
- John Wellington Ennis (born 1973), American filmmaker and activist
- John Matthew Ennis, known as J. Matthew Ennis (1864–1921), organist and academic in Adelaide, South Australia
- Kerron Ennis (born 1982), Jamaican singer
- Séamus Ennis (1919–1982), Irish folk musician and singer
- Seth Ennis (born 1992), American country singer
- Skinnay Ennis (1907–1963), American jazz and pop music bandleader and singer
- Sue Ennis, American songwriter

== Politics and military ==
- Baxter Ennis, American politician
- Bruce Ennis (born 1939), American politician
- Charles D. Ennis (1843–1930), American soldier
- Cornelius Ennis (1813–1899), American entrepreneur
- George Ennis (born 1953), Northern Irish politician
- George Francis Macdaniel Ennis (1868–1993), British lawyer and colonial judge
- Helena McAuliffe-Ennis (born 1951), Irish politician
- Jeffrey Ennis (born 1952), British politician
- Michael E. Ennis, American general
- Sir John Ennis, 1st Baronet (1800–1878), Irish politician
- Sir John Ennis, 2nd Baronet (1842–1884), Irish politician
- Nicholas Ennis (1815–1881), Irish politician
- Sinéad Ennis, Northern Irish politician
- William Ennis, multiple people

== Sport ==
- Akeem Ennis-Brown (born 1995), English boxer
- Al Ennis (1897–1958), American football executive and tennis player
- Del Ennis (1925–1996), American Major League baseball player
- Delloreen Ennis-London (born 1975), Jamaican sprint hurdler
- Dylan Ennis (born 1991), Canadian basketballer
- Ethan Ennis (born 2004), English footballer
- Frank Ennis (born 1955), Irish rugby union player
- Glen Ennis (born 1964), Canadian rugby player
- James Ennis (cricketer) (1900–1976), Irish cricketer
- James Ennis III (born 1990), American basketballer
- Jaron Ennis (born 1997), American boxer
- James Ennis (basketball) (born 1990), American professional basketball player
- Jessica Ennis (born 1986), British heptathlete
- Jessie Ennis (1908–2006), English motorcyclist
- Jim Ennis (born 1967), Canadian ice hockey player
- John Ennis (baseball) (born 1979), American Major League baseball player
- Michael Ennis (born 1984), Australian rugby league player
- Mick Ennis (1901–1948), Australian rules footballer
- Niall Ennis (born 1999), English footballer
- Paul Ennis (born 1990), English footballer
- Rachel Ennis (born 1987), British gymnast and coach
- Russ Ennis (1897–1949), American baseball player
- Sarah Ennis (born 1975), Irish equestrian
- Tyler Ennis (basketball) (born 1994), Canadian Israeli Basketball Premier League basketball player, formerly NBA basketball player basketball player
- Tyler Ennis (ice hockey), Canadian NHL hockey player

== Other ==
- Bruce Ennis (1940–2000), American lawyer
- Edward Ennis (1908–1990), American lawyer
- Lawrence Ennis (1871–1938), Scottish engineer
- Madeleine Ennis, Northern Irish pharmacologist

== See also ==
- Innis § Surname
- The Ennis Sisters
