= General Ennis =

General Ennis may refer to:

- Michael E. Ennis (fl. 1970s–2000s), U.S. Marine Corps major general
- William Ennis (general, born 1841) (1841–1938), U.S. Army brigadier general
- William P. Ennis (general, born 1878) (1878–1968), U.S. Army brigadier general, son of the above
- William P. Ennis (general, born 1904) (1904–1989), U.S. Army lieutenant general, son of the above

== See also ==
- Roger Enos (1729–1808), Vermont Militia major general in the American Revolutionary War
