= INI =

INI may refer to:

== Computing ==
- INI file, a configuration file for computer applications
- Impact Nominal Index, a computer system to track and trace individuals during criminal investigations

== Organizations ==
- Isaac Newton Institute (INI)
- Instituto Nacional de Industria (INI), Spanish industrial development organization
- Instituto Nacional Indigenista (INI), Mexico's (defunct) government agency for indigenous people
- INI Steel, a group by Hyundai Motor Company
- Inspiration Network International, a Christian TV channel in South Carolina, United States
- The first International Neuroscience Institute, in Hanover, Germany
- The third International Neuroscience Institute, in Tehran, Iran

== People ==
- Ini Dima-Okojie, Nigerian actress
- Nyuserre Ini, pharaoh of the 5th Dynasty of Egypt, during the 25th century BCE, Old Kingdom
- Qakare Ini, pretender to the Egyptian throne during the 11th or 12th Dynasty
- Merhotepre Ini, pharaoh of the 13th Dynasty of Egypt during the Second Intermediate Period, c. 1675 BC
- Mershepsesre Ini II, pharaoh of the late 13th Dynasty of Egypt during the Second Intermediate Period, c. 1650 BC
- Menkheperre Ini, a king of the 23rd Dynasty of Egypt ruling over Thebes, during the Third Intermediate Period in the 8th century BC
- King Ini of Wessex, more commonly called Ine of Wessex

== Places ==
- INI, the IATA code of Niš Constantine the Great Airport in Serbia
- Ini, Iran (disambiguation)
- Ini, Akwa Ibom, an administrative division of Akwa Ibom State

== Music ==
- InI (hip hop group)
- Ini Kamoze, a reggae artist
- INI (Japanese boy group)

== Other ==
- Ini (Armenian letter), a letter of the Armenian alphabet
- Ini (Georgian letter), a letter of the Georgian alphabet
- According to Rastafari philosophy, "I-N-I" a.k.a. "I-and-I" is the personification of one who lives by Rastafari ideals, or specifically how one chooses to view oneself.
- Ini (Stephen King), a term for an inter-dimensional portal in two books by author Stephen King, Desperation and The Regulators
- Institute of National Importance (INI), a status that may be conferred to a higher education institution in India by an act of parliament.

== See also ==
- INIS (disambiguation)
