= Innis =

Innis may refer to:

== Places ==
- Innis, Louisiana, U.S.
- Innis College, University of Toronto, Canada

== People ==
=== Surname ===
- Chris Innis, American film editor and filmmaker
- Cynthia Ona Innis (born 1969), American artist
- Daniel Innis (born 1963), American academic and politician
- Donald Innis (born 1931), American architect and engineer
- Donald Quayle Innis (1924–1988), Canadian geographer, son of Harold Innis and Mary Quayle
- Doris Funnye Innis (1933–2015) American Civil Rights writer and educator
- Harold Innis (1894–1952), Canadian political economy professor who wrote on communication
- Hubert Van Innis (1866–1961), Belgian Olympic archer
- Jeff Innis (1962-2022), American pitcher in Major League Baseball
- Jennifer Innis (born 1959), Guyanese/American athlete
- John G. Innis, Liberian educator, author, and clergyman
- Mary Quayle Innis (1899–1972), Canadian author
- Niger Innis (born 1968), American activist and politician, National Spokesperson for the Congress of Racial Equality
- Roy Innis (1934–2017), American activist and politician, National Chairman of the Congress of Racial Equality
- William T. Innis (1826–1901), American politician and farmer

=== Given name ===
- Innis Brown (1884–1961), American football player and sportswriter
- Innis Gaines (born 1998), American football player
- Innis Green, Jacksonian Democrat member of the U.S. House of Representatives from Pennsylvania
- Innis N. Palmer (1824–1900), American Civil War major general
- Innis Palmer Swift (1882–1953), World War II major general and Innis N. Palmer's grandson

== See also ==
- INIS (disambiguation)
- Innes (disambiguation)
- Ennis (disambiguation)
- Ennes (disambiguation)
