= Innisfallen (disambiguation) =

Innisfallen is an island in Lough Leane, County Kerry, Ireland, which is the location of the ruins of a 7th century monastic abbey.

Innisfallen may also refer to:

- Innisfallen (ship), the name of several ships
- Innisfallen Castle and grounds, Castle Cove, City of Willoughby, New South Wales, Australia
- Innisfail, Queensland, originally called Innisfallen after the island in County Kerry

== See also ==
- INIS (disambiguation)
- Innis (disambiguation)
- Fallen (disambiguation)
- Annals of Inisfallen, a chronicle of medieval Ireland
