= Alan Cairns =

Canadian political scientist (1930–2018)

Hugh Alan Craig Cairns
- Born: March 2, 1930; Galt, Ontario, Canada
- Died: August 27, 2018 (aged 88); Waterloo, Ontario, Canada
- Education: University of Toronto; St Antony's College, Oxford
- Awards: Order of Canada

Hugh Alan Craig Cairns, OC FRSC (2 March 1930 – 27 August 2018) was a Canadian political scientist and professor. His scholarship focused on diverse topics within Canadian politics, including federalism, the Charter of Rights and Freedoms, electoral politics, the role of the courts, the Judicial Committee of the Privy Council, and Indigenous issues. Cairns was a leading expert of federalism and governance, and his scholarship remains foundational in Canadian political science.

== Biography ==
=== Early life ===
Cairns was born on 2 March 1930 in Galt, Ontario (modern day Cambridge, Ontario) to Scottish immigrants Hugh Cairns and Lily Crawford, a factory worker and homemaker respectively. He had two older brothers, John and Jim Cairns. He was a star pitcher for the baseball team the Galt Pups.

=== Education ===
For secondary school, Cairns attended Galt Collegiate Institute and Vocational School. He did his undergraduate and master's degrees at the University of Toronto. He achieved his doctorate at Oxford University, conducting research on British precolonial views of Africa while in Rhodesia.

=== Career ===
Cairns worked as a professor at the University of British Columbia from 1960 to his retirement in 1995. He served as the head of the political science department from 1973 to 1980. He held visiting appointments at Harvard University, University of Toronto, Memorial University of Newfoundland, University of Edinburgh, Queen's University, University of Saskatchewan, and York University. Starting 2000, after his retirement from University of British Columbia, he served as adjunct professor at the University of Waterloo, as a guest lecturer in upper year seminars and an examiner for masters defences.

Cairns was a member of the Hawthorn Report (officially A Survey of the Contemporary Indians of Canada: Economic, Political, Educational Needs and Policies) in 1966 and 1967. The report was undertaken following a 1964 request by the Canadian federal government to the University of British Columbia to assess the well-being of Canada's Indigenous peoples. The report, edited by Harry B. Hawthorn, found that Indigenous people should be regarded as part of Canada's community, but with "plus" components added to citizenship, reflecting their historical and contemporary deprivation of citizenship benefits and subjection to violence. The specific contents of the "plus" were to be worked out in future political processes, but were to follow Indigenous treaties and traditions. The findings were rejected by the government in favour of a system of civic integration embodied in the 1969 Statement of the Government of Canada on Indian Policy, also known as the "White Paper."

He served as an adviser to the government of British Columbia during the constitution patriation negotiations of the 1970s and 1980s.

=== Personal life ===
Cairns married Patricia Grady and had three daughters. From 2000 until his death, he lived with his partner Anne Innis Dagg in Waterloo. Dagg was a zoologist renowned for her work on giraffes, and the daughter of economic historian Harold Innis and historian Mary Quayle. Cairns was a member of the Royal Society of Canada.

=== Death ===
Cairns died 27 August 2018 in Waterloo, Ontario.

== Scholarship and legacy ==
Cairns' scholarship has explored a multitude of issues within Canadian political science, sparking decades of debate and refinement of his ideas. In reference to Cairn's intellectual legacy, Gerald Kernerman and Philip Resnick state: "On a remarkably wide range of topics – from the regional impact of Canada's electoral system, the role of the Judicial Committee of the Privy Council, and the development of Canadian federalism to the ongoing efforts to constitutionally reshape the federation and the effects on minorities of the Charter of Rights and Freedoms – Cairns has initiated and shaped many of our most pivotal debates."

Following the Hawthorn Report, Cairns invented the phrase "Citizens plus" to refer to Indigenous Canadians' role in Canadian federalism, referring to a complex vision of Indigenous integration into the Canadian political structure that accommodates different sets of rights based on relevant historical, socioeconomic, and cultural differences, in opposition to the White Paper's assimilationist stance. His approach to Indigenous federalism has been criticized by authors writing for the Review of Constitutional Studies for misrepresenting Indigenous nationalism, subjugating Indigenous differences under broad constitutional one-ness, and framing Indigenous rights movement as supplicants.

In the Canadian political science debate of whether Canada was initially intended to be centralized or decentralized, Cairns said in 1971 that "the pursuit of the real meaning of the [Constitution Act, 1867] is [...] a meaningless game, incapable of a decisive outcome." He was among the first authors who argued that the Canadian electoral system exacerbates regional cleavages by awarding parties that concentrate regionally rather than at a national scale.

Cairns' most famous piece of writing on Canadian politics is likely his 1971 article "The Judicial Committee of the Privy Council and its Critics" which discusses judicial activism in Canada. It is often listed as one of the most-cited academic works concerned with the Canadian political system.

Publications by Cairns continue to be among the most read in Canadian political science. His "The Electoral System and the Party System in Canada: 1921–1965" is the most used individual political science text across Canadian political science university departments, and three more works appear in the top ten most used.

== Honours and awards ==
- 1982: Molson Prize for his outstanding contributions to Canadian social science. Given by Andre Fortier.
- 1988: Officer of the Order of Canada for his influence in shaping modern Canadian politics.
- 2003: City of Cambridge Hall of Fame.

He has received honorary degrees from Carleton University (1994), The University of Toronto (1996), The University of British Columbia (1998) and the University of Saskatchewan (2002).
