= Behnam Safavi =

Iranian singer and composer (1983–2019)

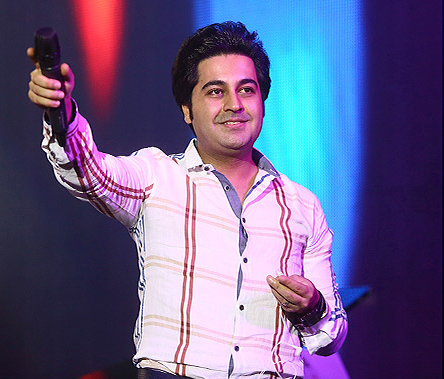
- Safavi in 2013
- Born: Sayyid Behnam Safavi; 6 July 1983; Shiraz, Iran
- Died: 13 May 2019 (aged 35); Isfahan, Iran
- Education: Islamic Azad University, Najafabad Branch
- Occupations: Singer; composer; music arranger
- Years active: 2004–2019
- Musical career
- Genres: Iranian pop
- Instruments: Vocals; piano; percussion; guitar
- Labels: Pouya Music (2009); Avaye Honar (2012, 2014); Exir Novin (2016)
- Website: behnam-safavi.ir

Sayyid Behnam Safavi (6 July 1983 – 13 May 2019) was an Iranian singer, composer and music arranger.

== Personal life ==
Safavi was born on 6 July 1983 in Shiraz. He had an older and a younger sister. Two weeks after his birth the family moved to Bandar-e Mahshahr, where they stayed until he was 16. He pursued a master's degree in civil engineering at the Islamic Azad University, Najafabad Branch, after which he moved to Tehran where he lived until 2018. In 2012, he married Hoda Khademi with whom he had a son.

== Career ==
Safavi started learning music at a young age by teaching himself piano. He then learned to play percussion instruments. His first official release was the album Eshghe Man Bash in 2009. He had started working on the studio album after receiving positive feedback on his single "Tamanna" (2006). Safavi was considered one of the young stars of Iranian pop music, known by nicknames such as "Sultan of Peace" and "Polite Boy of Iranian Music".

== Illness and death ==
In 2013, Safavi was diagnosed with a brain tumor and underwent surgery on 20 July 2015. His condition improved afterwards and he released a studio album titled Mojezeh (lit. Miracle) In 2017 his condition deteriorated and he went to Germany for further treatments. He underwent surgery by Majid Samii at the International Neuroscience Institute in Hanover before returning to Iran. His treatment continued between 2017 and 2018 until he became critically ill on 26 December 2018, after which he was hospitalized for 43 days at a hospital in Tehran. He then moved to Isfahan for a more agreeable climate but was hospitalized again on 16 April 2019. He died 27 days later, on 13 May 2019, and was later buried at a cemetery in Shahinshahr.

The death of another pop singer, Morteza Pashaei, became an unprecedented social phenomenon in Iranian society, forcing the media and sociologists to analyze and investigate the cause of this issue, but this did not happen after Safavi's death. The Iranian Students' News Agency wrote in an article titled Why Behnam Safavi Did Not Become Morteza Pashaei: "Both are pop singers. Both are popular. Both fall ill at once and pass away a few years apart; but the death of the first becomes a phenomenon and the other does not. Why?!"

== Discography ==
=== Studio albums ===
Title	Release	Notes	Number of tracks
Begoo Doostam Dari	2004	unofficial release	9
Eshghe Man Bash	2009		9
Aramesh	2011		9
Fogholadeh	2014		11
Mojezh	2016		13

=== Compositions and arrangements for other artists ===
Title	Artist	Writer	Composer	Arranger
Ta'ne	Hamid Askari	Farhad Zare	Farhad Zare	Behnam Safavi
Ki Avaz Shode	Hamid Askari	Hamid Askari	Hamid Askari	Behnam Safavi
Bavar	Hamid Askari	Farhad Zare	Farhad Zare	Behnam Safavi
Cheshmaye To	Hamid Askari	Mohammad Kazemi	Shahab Ramezan	Behnam Safavi
Cheshmane Siyah	Eshan Aria	Xaniar Khosravi	Behnam Safavi	Behnam Safavi
Kash Too Donyaye To Boodam	Ehsan Aria	Mohammad Bekrani	Behnam Safavi	Farhad Zare
Che Mehraboon	Ehsan Aria	Maryam Asadi	Behnam Safavi	Behnam Safavi
Albume Mahe Gharib	Mehdi Abdoli	various	Ahmad Zakariyayi	Behnam Safavi
Sargashte	Hossein Keshtkar	Fayez Dashti	Behnam Safavi	Behnam Safavi
Shabaye Sard	Ali Pourian	Milad Latifi	Behnam Safavi	Behnam Safavi
Khalvate Shab	Afshin Sepehr	Bita Riahi	Behnam Safavi	Behnam Safavi
Dar Entehaye Shab	Afshin Sepehr	Ahura Iman	Behnam Safavi	Behnam Safavi
Khatereh	Afshin Sepehr	Rouhangiz Bonyadloo	Behnam Safavi	Behnam Safavi
Sare in Koocheh	Afshin Sepehr	Zahra Kalateh	Omid Hojjat	Behnam Safavi
Ghabe Aks	Afshin Sepehr	Bita Riahi	Afshin Sepehr	Behnam Safavi
Ta'me Masti	Afshin Sepehr	Shahab Afshar	Afshin Sepehr	Behnam Safavi
Golkam	Afshin Sepehr	Bita Rihahi	Behnam Safavi	Behnam Safavi
Intro to Matame Eshgh	Afshin Sepehr		Behnam Safavi	Behnam Safavi
Matame Eshgh	Afshin Sepehr	Rouhangiz Bonyadloo	Afshin Sepehr	Behnam Safavi
Ajab Hoseleh Dari	Afshin Sepehr	Dariush Izadpour	Behnam Safavi	Behnam Safavi
Vaghti Nisti (Entezar)	Afshin Sepehr	Mohsen Saeed os-Sadat	Behnam Safavi	Behnam Safavi
Ahooyi Daram Khoshgeleh		Reza Neghabat	Benyamin Bahadori	Behnam Safavi
Zibatarin Ranginkaman	Chera (fictional puppet)	Reza Neghabat	Reza Neghabat	Behnam Safavi
