= Günther Feigl =

Austrian neurosurgeon

Günther C. Feigl (born in 1968 in Graz) is an Austrian neurosurgeon who is an expert in micro and minimally invasive neurosurgery. His main areas of expertise include neuro-oncology, neuroendoscopy, and complex skull base surgery. He specializes in the surgery of gliomas, minimally invasive endoscopy-assisted microvascular decompression in trigeminal neuralgia and facial hemispasm as well as the surgery of acoustic neuromas, tumors of the pineal gland and meningiomas of the skull base.

Feigl has authored numerous peer-reviewed publications and book chapters, and has made significant contributions to the advancement of micro and minimally invasive neurosurgery, skull base surgery, neuro-oncology and radiosurgery.

== Education ==
Feigl began his medical education in the USA. After studying in Dallas, Houston and Graz and several years of brain tumor research at the Neuroscience Institute at Baylor College of Medicine in the Texas Medical Center in Houston, the largest medical center in the world, he was working on his thesis on radiosurgery in the treatment of pituitary tumors using the gamma-knife method.

He started his neurosurgical training in Germany, where he trained at INI (International Neuroscience Institute) in Hannover with the worldwide renowned neurosurgeon and pioneer in the field of neurosurgery Madjid Samii. He later continued his residency in neurosurgery at the Eberhard Karls University of Tübingen under the guidance of Marcos Tatagiba, where he received his second doctoral degree and earned his PhD.

== Career ==
Feigl studied at the Eberhard Karls University Tübingen and acquired an associate professorship for neurosurgery. As Head of Skull Base Surgery at Katharinenhospital in Stuttgart, he specialized in minimally invasive neurosurgery and neuroendoscopy.

From December 2015 to March 2025, Feigl was chairman of the department of neurosurgery at Klinikum Bamberg. He was Medical Director of the Skull Base and Brain Tumor Center which he founded as part of the clinic and social foundation Bamberg (Sozialstiftung Bamberg). He was also the Medical Director of Neuronetz Bamberg practice center and served as Head of the interdisciplinary Spine Center for maximum care, which he initiated and founded. The center is the third interdisciplinary spine center (neurosurgery/orthopedic surgery) in Bavaria and the first non-university center in the region.

Since April 2025, Feigl has been working in private practice in Vienna and leading the Department of Minimally Invasive Neurosurgery as Chief Physician at Oberwart Hospital.

Feigl became an affiliate faculty member at the Houston Methodist Research Institute (HMRI) Neurosciences Research Program in March 2018 and Adjunct Professor of Neurosurgery at the Houston Methodist Hospital (IAM) in December 2019.

Feigl is a member of the medical advisory board of the Acoustic Schwannoma Patient Support Group, the German Skull Base Society and the German Neurological Society. He is a founding member of the European Low Grade Glioma Network (ELGGN).

== Selected publications ==
- Feigl, Günther Christian; Bonelli, Christine Maria; Berghold, Andrea; Mokry, Michael (1 December 2002). "Effects of gamma knife radiosurgery of pituitary adenomas on pituitary function". Journal of Neurosurgery. 97 (Supplement 5): 415–421. doi:10.3171/jns.2002.97.supplement_5.0415. PMID 12507067.
- Szelényi, Andrea; Bello, Lorenzo; Duffau, Hugues; Fava, Enrica; Feigl, Guenther C.; Galanda, Miroslav; Neuloh, Georg; Signorelli, Francesco; Sala, Francesco; Workgroup for Intraoperative Management in Low-Grade Glioma Surgery within the European Low-Grade Glioma, Network. (February 2010). "Intraoperative electrical stimulation in awake craniotomy: methodological aspects of current practice". Neurosurgical Focus. 28 (2): E7. doi:10.3171/2009.12.FOCUS09237. PMID 20121442.
- Feigl, Guenther C.; Ritz, Rainer; Moraes, Mario; Klein, Jan; Ramina, Kristofer; Gharabaghi, Alireza; Krischek, Boris; Danz, Soeren; Bornemann, Antje; Liebsch, Marina; Tatagiba, Marcos S. (August 2010). "Resection of malignant brain tumors in eloquent cortical areas: a new multimodal approach combining 5-aminolevulinic acid and intraoperative monitoring: Clinical article". Journal of Neurosurgery. 113 (2): 352–357. doi:10.3171/2009.10.JNS09447. PMID 19911888.
- Feigl, G. C.; Decker, K.; Wurms, M.; Krischek, B.; Ritz, R.; Unertl, K.; Tatagiba, M. (2013). "Neurosurgical procedures in the semisitting position: Evaluation of the risk of paradoxical venous air embolism in patients with a patent foramen ovale". World Neurosurgery.
