= William Ennis =

William Ennis may refer to:

- William J. Ennis (1862–1925), American Jesuit educator and president of Loyola University Maryland
- William Ennis (general, born 1841) (1841–1938), United States Army officer
- William P. Ennis (general, born 1878) (1878–1968), United States Army officer, son of the above
- William P. Ennis (general, born 1904) (1904–1989), United States Army officer, son of the above
- Bill Ennis-Inge (born 1973), American football coach and player
