= Enne =

Enne may refer to:

- Enne Dam, a dam in Kütahya Province, Turkey
- Canton of Enne et Alzou, an administrative division of Aveyron, France
- Enne Limited, a data company founded by Antonino Letteriello

== People with the surname ==
- Merika Enne (born 1992), Finnish snowboarder

== See also ==
- Ennes (disambiguation)
- Ñ, a letter used in Spanish and other languages
