= John Ennis =

John Ennis may refer to:

- John Ennis (actor) (born 1964), American actor and comic
- John Ennis (baseball) (born 1979), American former Major League Baseball right-handed relief pitcher
- John Wellington Ennis (born 1973), American filmmaker, activist, and blogger
- Sir John Ennis, 1st Baronet (1800–1878), Member of Parliament for Athlone, 1857–1865
- Sir John Ennis, 2nd Baronet (1842–1884), Member of Parliament for Athlone, 1868–1874 and 1880–1884
- John Ennis v. Smith, see List of United States Supreme Court cases, volume 55
- John Ennis, developer of Shippan Point
- John Ennis (artist) (born 1953), American painter
- John Ennis (poet) (born 1944), Irish poet
- J. Matthew Ennis (1864–1921), English pianist and organist

== See also ==
- Ennis (disambiguation)
