= Iran International Neuroscience Institute =

Iranian research institute and hospital

Coordinates: 35°45′46.04″N 51°12′39.5″E

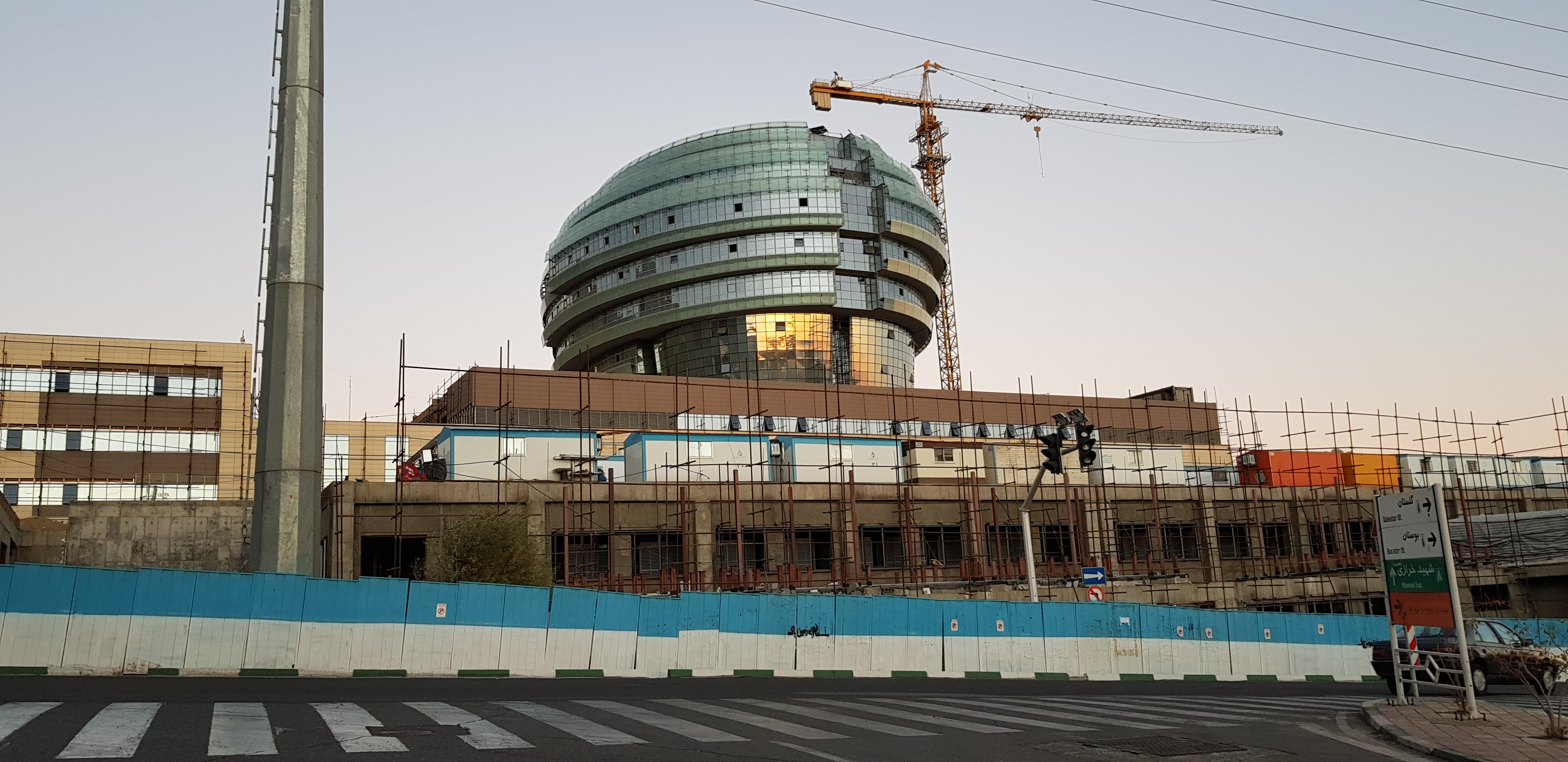
- The "Iran INI", 2017 December
- Type: Institute & Hospital
- Founder: Professor Majid Samii, Under Construction
- Headquarters: Iran

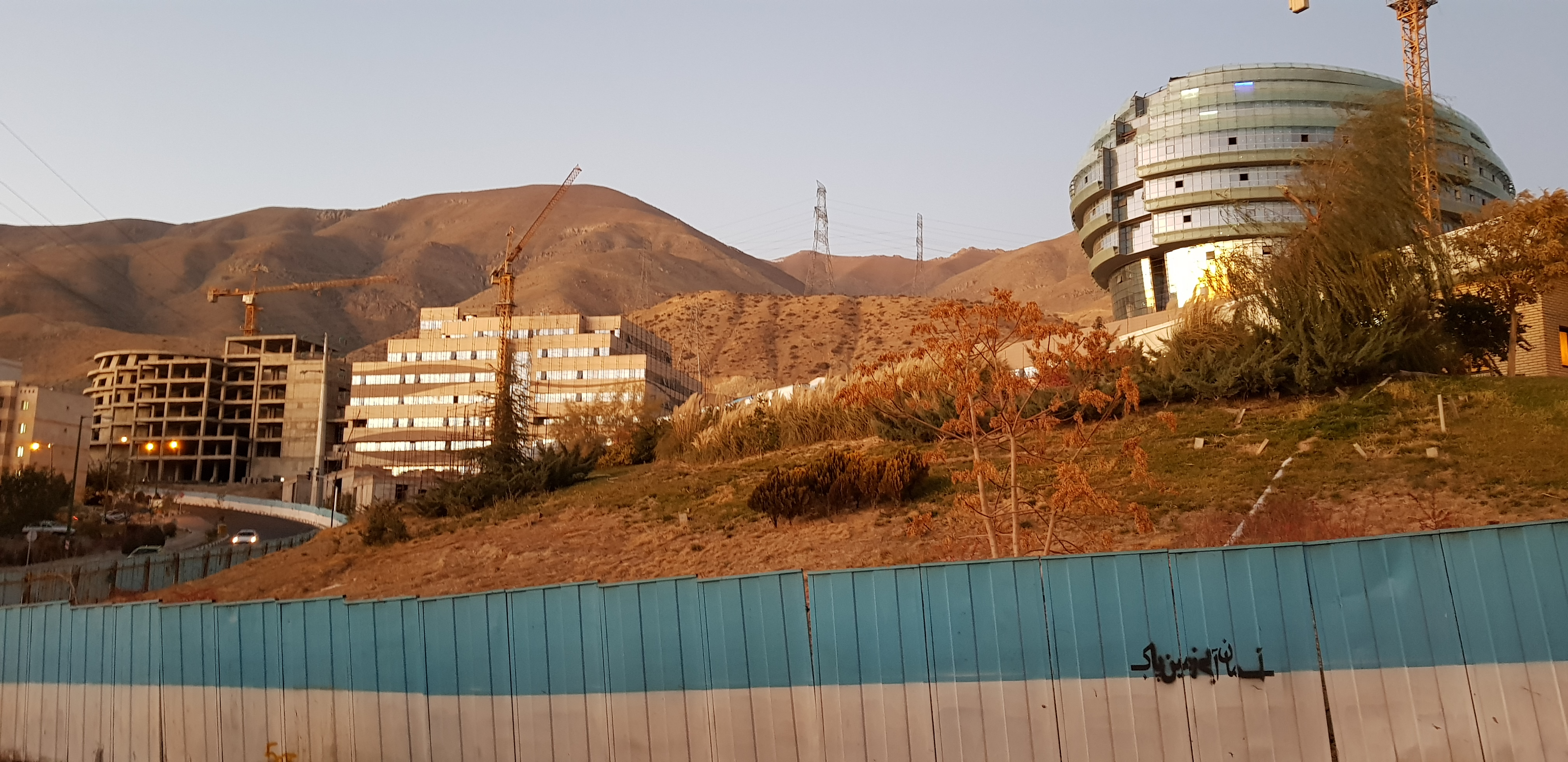
Right side: The INI, and the Skeletal building on the left side is Samii Brain Museum.

The Iran International Neuroscience Institute (Persian: بنیاد علمی بین‌المللی علوم مغز و اعصاب ایران) or Iran INI (Persian: آی‌ان‌آی ایران) is an International research centre and hospital located in Tehran, Iran. It is the largest centre of Neuroscience researches in the world and third version of its own kind that was founded by professor Majid Samii. The first INI is in Hanover of Germany. This research centre of 80,000 square metres (860,000 sq ft) is being constructed in 11 floors.

== See also ==
- List of hospitals in Iran
