= INIS =

INIS may refer to:

- Ennis, a town in County Clare, Ireland (Irish name: Inis)
- International Nuclear Information System, a collection of nuclear science information
- Iraqi National Intelligence Service
- iNiS Corporation, a Japanese video game developer
- Institut national de l'image et du son, a training institute in Montreal, Canada
- Irish Naturalisation and Immigration Service, an agency of the Irish government
- INIS character set, a subset of ASCII

== See also ==
- Innis (disambiguation)
- INI (disambiguation)
