= Glen Innes =

Glen Innes may refer to:

- Glen Innes, New South Wales, a town in Australia
- Glen Innes, New Zealand, a suburb of Auckland

== See also ==
- Innes (disambiguation)
