= Ennis (disambiguation) =

Ennis is the county town of County Clare, Ireland.

Ennis may also refer to:

== Places ==
- Ennis, Kentucky U.S.
- Ennis, Montana, U.S.
- Ennis, Texas, U.S.
- Ennis, West Virginia, U.S.
- Ennis House, a building in Los Angeles, California, U.S.

Historical

- Ennis (Parliament of Ireland constituency)
- Ennis (UK Parliament constituency)

Fictional

- Ennis, Alaska, a town featured in the American anthology crime drama television series True Detective (season 4)

== Other uses ==
- Ennis (surname)
- Murder of Ennis Cosby, the son of entertainer Bill Cosby
- Ennis Del Mar, character from the story "Brokeback Mountain"
- Ennis Esmer (born 1978), Turkish-Canadian actor and comedian
- Ennis Rakestraw Jr. (born 2002), American football player

== See also ==
- Ennes (disambiguation)
- Enniskillen, county town of County Fermanagh, Northern Ireland
- Innis (disambiguation)
