= INIS-8 =

8-bit character encoding for the International Nuclear Information System

INIS-8 is an 8-bit character encoding developed by the International Nuclear Information System (INIS). It is an 8-bit extension of the 7-bit INIS character set (itself a subset of ASCII), adding a G1 set, and has MIB 52. It is also known as iso-ir-50 (after the ISO 2022 registration of its G1 set) and csISO50INIS8.

== Character set ==
INIS-8
	0	1	2	3	4	5	6	7	8	9	A	B	C	D	E	F
0x																
1x												ESC		GS	RS	
2x	SP				$	%		'	(	)	*	+	,	-	.	/
3x	0	1	2	3	4	5	6	7	8	9	:	;	<	=	>	
4x		A	B	C	D	E	F	G	H	I	J	K	L	M	N	O
5x	P	Q	R	S	T	U	V	W	X	Y	Z	[		]		
6x		a	b	c	d	e	f	g	h	i	j	k	l	m	n	o
7x	p	q	r	s	t	u	v	w	x	y	z		|		~	DEL
8x																
9x																
Ax																
Bx											α	β	γ	σ (Note: Perl libintl mappings use a lowercase delta here. However, the ISO-IR-50 registration itself both shows and names it as a lowercase sigma.)	Ξ	
Cx																
Dx															→	∫
Ex	⁰	¹	²	³	⁴	⁵	⁶	⁷	⁸	⁹	⁺	⁻	√	Δ	Λ	Ω
Fx	₀	₁	₂	₃	₄	₅	₆	₇	₈	₉	Σ	μ	ν	ω	π	

== ISO-IR-51 ==
ISO-IR-51, "INIS Cyrillic Extension", is an alternative G1 set for 8-bit INIS, supporting KOI-8 encoded Russian alphabet letters, at the expense of the superscript and subscript digits.

INIS-8 with Cyrillic set
	0	1	2	3	4	5	6	7	8	9	A	B	C	D	E	F
0x																
1x												ESC		GS	RS	
2x	SP				$	%		'	(	)	*	+	,	-	.	/
3x	0	1	2	3	4	5	6	7	8	9	:	;	<	=	>	
4x		A	B	C	D	E	F	G	H	I	J	K	L	M	N	O
5x	P	Q	R	S	T	U	V	W	X	Y	Z	[		]		
6x		a	b	c	d	e	f	g	h	i	j	k	l	m	n	o
7x	p	q	r	s	t	u	v	w	x	y	z		|		~	DEL
8x																
9x																
Ax													√		→	∫
Bx	α	β	γ	σ	Σ	μ	ν	ω	π	Ξ	Δ	Λ	Ω	Ъ	⁻	⁺
Cx	ю	а	б	ц	д	е	ф	г	х	и	й	к	л	м	н	о
Dx	п	я	р	с	т	у	ж	в	ь	ы	з	ш	э	щ	ч	ъ
Ex	Ю	А	Б	Ц	Д	Е	Ф	Г	Х	И	Й	К	Л	М	Н	О
Fx	П	Я	Р	С	Т	У	Ж	В	Ь	Ы	З	Ш	Э	Щ	Ч	

== See also ==
- INIS character set
