= Bob Innes (Scottish footballer) =

Scottish footballer

Robert A. Innes (23 July 1878 – 1959) was a Scottish professional footballer of the early twentieth century. Born in Lanark, he played for Notts County and Nottingham Forest between 1901 and 1905, and made a total of 71 appearances in the English Football League.
