= Donald Quayle Innis =

Canadian geographer

Donald Quayle Innis (April 21, 1924 – August 24, 1988), son of Harold Innis and Mary Quayle, was a geographer, whose primary research interest was the use of intercropping in traditional agriculture. Following his undergraduate degree at the University of Toronto, he studied under Carl O. Sauer at the University of California at Berkeley, with field studies culminating in a PhD dissertation on Human Ecology in Jamaica. He subsequently applied the knowledge gained about farming practices in Jamaica to further studies of traditional agriculture, most notably in Maharashtra, India, as well as in other parts of India, Nepal, and Togo. His findings were published in numerous research papers, and in the book Intercropping and the Scientific Basis of Traditional Agriculture. He did extensive field studies to determine what crop combinations were used in traditional agriculture, comparing these to scientific investigations of the compatibility of various crops; and compared yields obtainable with and without the use of intercropping. Other research interests included communications and resource utilization. He taught at Queen's University, Canada, and at the Geneseo campus of the State University of New York, where he received the 1979 Chancellor's Award for Excellence in Teaching. He is commemorated by the Dr. Donald Innis Memorial Annual Minority Scholarship.
