= Anne Innis Dagg =

Canadian zoologist, feminist, and author (1933–2024)

Anne Innis Dagg CM
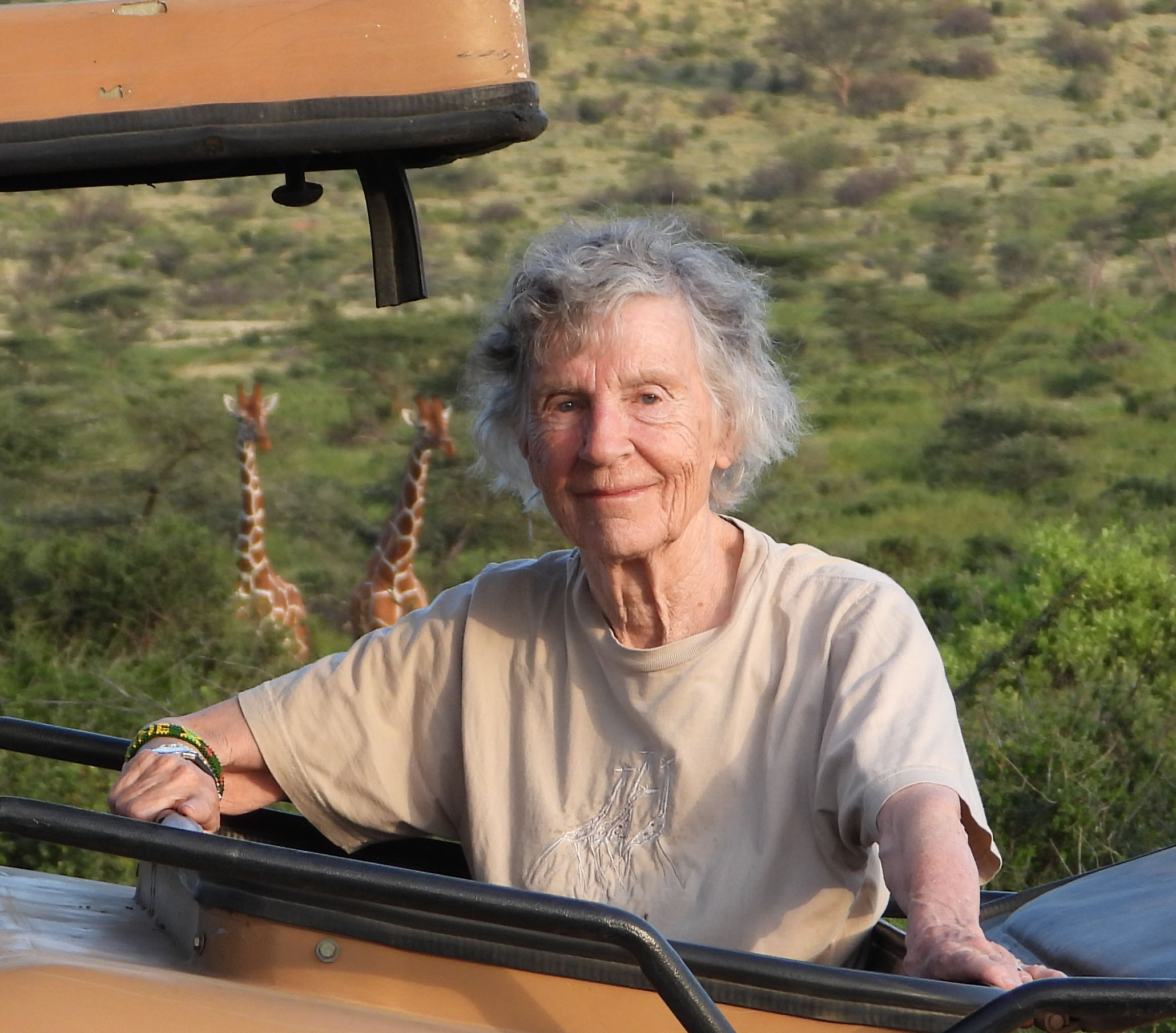
- Dagg in 2020
- Born: Anne Christine Innis; 25 January 1933; Toronto, Ontario, Canada
- Died: 1 April 2024 (aged 91); Kitchener, Ontario, Canada
- Education: University of Toronto (B.A., Biology, 1955); University of Toronto (M.A., Genetics, 1956); University of Waterloo (Ph.D., Animal Behaviour, 1967)
- Known for: Study of wild giraffes and gender bias in academia
- Spouse: Ian Ralph Dagg (m. 1957; died 1993)
- Children: 3
- Scientific career
- Fields: Zoology, feminism
- Workplaces: University of Waterloo; University of Guelph
- Thesis: Gaits and Their Development in the Infraorder Pecora (1967)
- Doctoral advisor: Anton de Vos
- Website: anneinnisdaggfoundation.org

Anne Christine Innis Dagg CM (25 January 1933 – 1 April 2024) was a Canadian zoologist, feminist, and author of numerous books. A pioneer in the study of animal behaviour in the wild, Dagg is credited with being the first person to study wild giraffes. Her impact on current understandings of giraffe biology and behaviour were the focus of the 2011 CBC radio documentary Wild Journey: The Anne Innis Story, the 2018 documentary film The Woman Who Loves Giraffes, and the 2021 children's book The Girl Who Loved Giraffes and Became the World's First Giraffologist.

In addition to her giraffe research, Dagg published extensively about camels, primates, and Canadian wildlife, and she raised concerns about the influence of sociobiology on how zoological research was shared with the general public. She also researched and wrote extensively about gender bias in academia, drawing attention to the detrimental impact that anti-nepotism rules can have on the academic careers of the wives of male faculty members and to sexist academic work environments that fail to support female researchers.

== Early life and education ==
Anne Christine Innis was born on 25 January 1933 in Toronto, Ontario. Her father, Harold Innis, was a professor of political economy at the University of Toronto and her mother, Mary Quayle Innis, was an author of short stories and books about history.

As a child, Dagg attended Bishop Strachan School. She graduated from the University of Toronto in 1955 with a BA in biology and was awarded a gold medal in recognition of her academic standing. She went on to earn a master's degree in genetics from the University of Toronto. Following field research in Africa, Dagg began a PhD in animal behaviour at the University of Waterloo, completing her studies in 1967.

== Career ==
Dagg published over 60 refereed scientific papers on such subjects as homosexuality, mammal behaviour, sociobiology, feminism, sexism at universities, and the rights of animals. She also wrote 20 books on related topics. Although best known for her research on the giraffe, Dagg studied other animals including camels, primates, and Canadian wildlife. She taught courses in mammalogy and wildlife management, among other topics, as an assistant professor with the Department of Zoology at the University of Guelph from 1968 to 1972. The remainder of her career was spent affiliated with the University of Waterloo's Integrated Studies program, later renamed Independent Studies. From 1986 to 1989, she served as the Academic Director of the program before transitioning to an academic advisor role.

Dagg's interest in Canadian wildlife arose in the late 1960s while teaching a course at the University of Guelph. She was surprised to discover how little research had been done on smaller mammals and birds, in favour of research on big game species in Ontario and British Columbia such as the caribou. In 1972, she founded Otter Press in Waterloo, Ontario. The first publication was Matrix Optics by her husband Ian Dagg, followed in 1974 by her own book on Canadian wildlife, Mammals of Waterloo and South Wellington Counties, which was co-written by C. A. Campbell.

Dagg also wrote about the gendered framing of animal behaviour. In 1985, she raised concerns about the impact of sociobiology in scholarly publications and reporting to the general public about the social behaviour of animals in her book Harems and Other Horrors: Sexual Bias in Behavioral Biology. Of particular concern was what she noted as an increase in the anthropomorphizing of animal behaviour such as inaccurate, human-based, language to describe animal behaviour such as female mating behaviour being described as coy or flirtatious.

In 1975, Dagg was recognized by the National Museum of Natural Sciences as part of an exhibit dedicated to their achievements in the natural sciences. She was awarded the Batke Human Rights Award in 1984 by the K-W Status of Women in recognition of her work in the fields of social justice and gender equality. Dagg received a Lane Anderson Award in 2017 in recognition of her non-fiction children's book 5 Giraffes, alongside author Caroline Fox. She donated the $10,000 prize that accompanied the award to giraffe conservation efforts. In 2019 Dagg was named an Honorary Member of the Canadian Society of Zoologists in recognition of her contributions to Canadian zoology.

Despite demonstrated academic achievement, Dagg was denied tenure at the University of Guelph in 1972 due to concerns about her qualifications. She claimed she was told by the Dean that she was denied tenure, in part, because she lived outside of Guelph with her family and was not involved in the community. Pointing to a strong research record, support from the student body, and the barring of women from participating on campus committees, Dagg called her treatment during the tenure review process "demoralizing" and framed the future of women in academia as "bleak" given the type of discrimination they face. Her academic ability was similarly questioned at the University of Waterloo where it was suggested there was no point in pursuing a position because she had a family and a husband to support them.

Dagg's research on giraffes and her experiences in South Africa during apartheid were featured on the CBC's radio series Ideas as part of the 2011 documentary Wild Journey: The Anne Innis Story by Sandy Bourque. The documentary was heard by Alison Reid, who later directed the 2018 documentary The Woman Who Loves Giraffes, chronicling Dagg's life, career and her recognized impact on the study of giraffes. The film includes interviews with members of the tenure review committee that rejected Dagg's application. The chair of the committee, Keith Ronald, stood by the decision to deny Dagg tenure explaining that despite being a good teacher, Dagg's research program, which at the time included 20 peer-reviewed publications, "hadn't been fully developed". Fellow committee member Sandy Middleton, who also appeared in the film, disagreed, framing the rejection as a "grossly unfair" example of an old boys network at work and was likely motivated by jealousy of Dagg's early career success. Following the release of the film, the University of Guelph issued a formal apology to Dagg and established the Dr. Anne Innis Dagg Summer Research Scholarship aimed at supporting the research of undergraduate women studying zoology or biodiversity.

On 27 December 2019, the office of Canadian Governor General Julie Payette announced that Dagg had been appointed a Member of the Order of Canada. She became invested in May 2022.

=== Giraffe field research ===
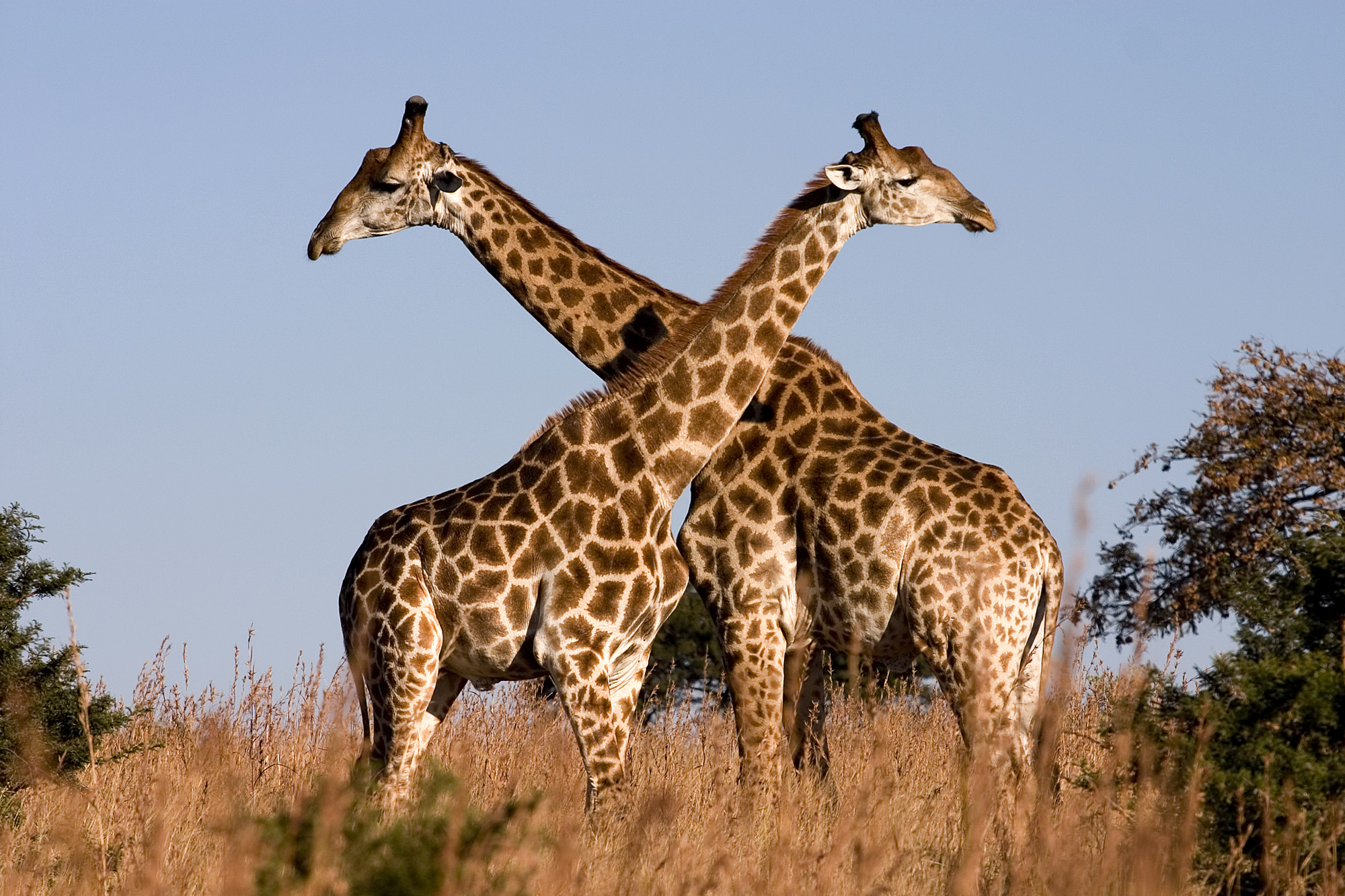
Male giraffes in South Africa.

Dagg was referred to as "the Jane Goodall of giraffes" and was recognized as having made significant contributions to the study of giraffes. Dagg first became interested in giraffes as a young child while visiting Illinois' Brookfield Zoo with her mother.

During the mid-1950s Dagg traveled alone to South Africa to study the behavior of giraffes out of captivity. The trip was prompted by what she described in 1974 interview with the Toronto Star as a "tremendous urge to see giraffes roaming free, instead of being cooped up in zoos." She contacted government officials in various African countries requesting permission to study the animal in their natural habitat and received only rejections, some noting the work was not a suitable undertaking for a woman.

Ahead of the trip Dagg changed tactics by adjusting how her letters were signed. She contacted citrus farmer Alexander Matthew, who owned land near Kruger National Park in close proximity to roaming giraffes, to ask for permission to visit and study giraffes. Her request was granted based on the Matthew's assumption that the letter, signed A. Innis, was written by a man. Upon Dagg's arrival he told her she would have to return to Canada because allowing her to bunk with the male farmhands was, for him, out of the question. Rather than returning home she travelled to Grahamstown where she spent her time researching giraffes at the Rhodes University library. She began writing to Matthew multiple times a week for several weeks asking for permission to return. He eventually agreed, allowing her to stay in his family's home in exchange for clerical services over the course of her stay. In turn, Dagg was given access to 33,000 hectares of groves and bush frequented by 95 giraffes.

Dagg spent upward of ten hours a day in the field taking extensive notes about all aspects of giraffe behaviour, including what they ate and how they interacted, and was the first to note male giraffes engaging in homosexual behaviour. In addition to her research in South Africa, she travelled to Tanganyika and Kenya to observe other giraffe populations over the course of her stay. Her research marked the first time a scientist set out to study giraffes in the wild. In 1965, due to the unique nature of her research, she was invited to appear on the American television show To Tell the Truth. Upon returning to Canada, she began a PhD in animal behaviour at the University of Waterloo, which she completed in 1967 under the supervision of Anton de Vos. Her thesis work analyzed and compared the gaits of giraffes and other large mammals. Dagg's field research was eventually published in The Giraffe: Its Biology, Behavior and Ecology (1976). Co-authored with ecologist J. Bristol Foster, the book is recognized by researchers as the foundational text on giraffes.

=== Gender inequality in academia ===
During her PhD studies, Dagg attempted to secure employment as a professor, but found that at the time universities were not inclined to hire women. Dagg's experience as a woman in academia would go on to shape her work and research interests for the remainder of her career. She researched and published about anti-nepotism laws at academic institutions in North America arguing that they disproportionately impact the female spouses of male professors. According to Dagg, anti-nepotism rules, whether formal or unspoken, combined with a reluctance by universities to hire their own PhD students doubly hindered the wives of male faculty: "A wife often earns a Ph.D. from the local university where she is then unable to become a professor because of this opposition. Unlike many other women, she may not be free because of her marriage to seek a position at a university outside her locale, a dilemma which makes her career vulnerable to the local university's policies."

In 1974, Dagg filed a complaint with the Ontario Human Rights Commission against Wilfrid Laurier University. The complaint was in regards to the school's refusal to interview her for a position in their biology department despite 19 years experience, opting to instead hire a male professor who she claimed had less experience and fewer qualifications. Dagg requested a formal review of the complaint by Ontario's Ombudsman after the Commission found that her claims were "absolutely without foundation."

Dagg further explored the experiences of women in academia in the 1988 book MisEducation: Women & Canadian Universities, co-authored with Patricia J. Thompson. The authors pointed to a reliance on course material and textbooks reliant on gender-based stereotypes, male co-workers making sexist jokes, and lack of support or funding for women researchers as example of how conditions at Canadian universities had not changed much for women over time. In a Globe and Mail interview, Dagg, who at the time had published 10 books and more than 50 scholarly articles, said about the book that she hoped her lack of tenure would not cost her her job.

== Personal life and death ==
Dagg married Ian Ralph Dagg (1928–1993) in 1957. The ceremony took place at St. Pancras Town Hall in London, England. Ian Dagg taught at the University of Waterloo's Physics Department from 1959 to 1993, and served as chair of the department from 1988 to 1993. Together until his death, the couple had three children: Hugh, Ian and Mary.

Dagg died on 1 April 2024, at the age of 91.

== Publications ==
=== Books ===
- Canadian Wildlife and Man. Toronto: McClelland and Stewart. 1974. ISBN 9780771025204. 192 pp.
- With J. Bristol Foster: The Giraffe: Its Biology, Behavior, and Ecology. NY: Van Nostrand Reinhold Co. 1976. xiii+210 pp.
- Wildlife Management in Europe. Waterloo, Ont.: Otter Press. 1977. ix+324 pp.
- Camel Quest: Summer Research on the Saharan Camel. Toronto: York Pub. & Print Co. 1978. ISBN 9780920424117. 192 pp.
- With Hilde Gauthier-Pilters: Gauthier-Pilters, Hilde; Dagg, Anne Innis; Gauthier-Pilters, Dagg (1981). The camel: its evolution, ecology, behavior, and relationship to man. University of Chicago Press. ISBN 0226284530. xii+208 pp.
- Harems and Other Horrors: Sexual Bias in Behavioral Biology. Waterloo, Ont.: Otter Press. 1983. ISBN 9780969096375. 125 pp.|
- The Fifty Percent Solution: Why Should Women Pay for Men's Culture?. Waterloo, Ont.: Otter Press. 1986. 128 pp.
- With Patricia J. Thompson: MisEducation: Women & Canadian Universities. Ontario Institute for Studies in Education Press. 1988. ISBN 978-0-7744-0318-4. OL 2139185M.
- The Feminine Gaze: A Canadian Compendium of Non-fiction Women Authors and Their Books, 1836–1945 (With foreword by Helen M. Buss). Waterloo, Ont.: Wilfrid Laurier U. Press. 2001. ISBN 0-88920-355-5. 355 pp.
- "Love of Shopping" Is Not a Gene: Problems with Darwinian Psychology. Montreal: Black Rose Press. 2005. ISBN 978-1-55164-256-7.
- Pursuing Giraffe: A 1950s Adventure. Waterloo, Ont.: Wilfrid Laurier U. Press. 2006. ISBN 9780889204638. 281 pp.
- The Social Behavior of Older Animals. Baltimore: Johns Hopkins U. Press. 2009. ISBN 9780801890505. ix+225 pp.
- Animal Friendships. New York: Cambridge U. Press. 2011. ISBN 9781107005426. viii+238 pp.
- With Lee E. Harding: Human Evolution and Male Aggression: Debunking the Myth of Man and Ape. Amherst, N.Y.: Cambria Press. 2012. ISBN 9781621968078.
- Giraffe: Behavior, and Conservation. New York: Cambridge U. Press. 2014. ISBN 9781107034860.
- Smitten By Giraffe: My Life as a Citizen Scientist. Montreal: McGill-Queen's University Press. 2016. p. 226. ISBN 978-0773547995.

=== Articles ===
- Innis, Anne Christine (September 1958). "The Behaviour of the Giraffe, Giraffa camelopardalis, in the Eastern Transvaal". Proceedings of the Zoological Society of London. 131 (2): 245–278. doi:10.1111/j.1096-3642.1958.tb00687.x.
- Dagg, Anne Innis (May 1960). "Gaits of the Giraffe and Okapi". Journal of Mammalogy. 41 (2): 282. doi:10.2307/1376381. JSTOR 1376381.
- Dagg, Anne Innis (19 January 1971). "Giraffa camelopardalis". Mammalian Species (5): 1–8. doi:10.2307/3503830. JSTOR 3503830.
