= John G. Innis =

Liberian educator, author and clergyman

John G. Innis is a Liberian educator, author and clergyman. He is the current Bishop of the Liberia Area of the United Methodist Church. Prior to his ascendancy as Bishop, He served as a pastor, a teacher, Administrative Assistant to the Bishop of the Liberia Area, Lecturer at the Gbarnga School of Theology, and Executive Secretary of the General Board of Global Ministries of the United Methodist Church.

He earned a Bachelor's degree in Education from the University of Liberia and a Masters of Divinity degree from Saint Paul School of Theology in Kansas City, Missouri.

His first book, By the Goodness of God: An Autobiography of John G. Innis (Abingdon Press, ISBN 978-0687022380) was published in 2003. Bishop Innis has written extensively on the highlights of the ministries and mission of the United Methodist Church since its birth on the soil of sub-Saharan Africa's first independent nation almost two centuries ago, and its resultant effect on church growth in Liberia.
