= Impact Nominal Index =

British police computer system

The Impact Nominal Index or INI was a computer system that enabled UK police forces to establish whether any other force holds information on a person of interest. It was created by the IMPACT Programme led by the Home Office in 2006. INI was shut down in 2011 when it was replaced by the Police National Database (PND). The system was built by the Web Technology Group, a former subsidiary of Cable & Wireless.

The INI was the first system to be delivered by the IMPACT Programme, set up to deliver improvements in the management and sharing of police operational information following Sir Michael Bichard's report on the Soham Murders.
