= INIS character set =

7-bit ASCII subset used for the International Nuclear Information System

INIS is a 7-bit subset of ASCII developed by the International Nuclear Information System (INIS). It has MIB 51 and is also known as iso-ir-49 and csISO49INIS.

== Character set ==
INIS 7-bit character set
	0	1	2	3	4	5	6	7	8	9	A	B	C	D	E	F
0x																
1x												ESC		GS	RS	
2x	SP				$	%		'	(	)	*	+	,	-	.	/
3x	0	1	2	3	4	5	6	7	8	9	:	;	<	=	>	
4x		A	B	C	D	E	F	G	H	I	J	K	L	M	N	O
5x	P	Q	R	S	T	U	V	W	X	Y	Z	[		]		
6x		a	b	c	d	e	f	g	h	i	j	k	l	m	n	o
7x	p	q	r	s	t	u	v	w	x	y	z		|		~	DEL

== See also ==
- ISO 646 § Variant comparison chart
- INIS-8
