= Harold E. Ennes =

American broadcasting pioneer

Harold E. Ennes was a broadcasting pioneer who authored many textbooks for broadcast and broadcast-related communications training. He was a member of the Indianapolis chapter of the Society of Broadcast Engineers. Harold made significant contributions to the early development of the SBE Certification Program a member of the SBE's national Certification Committee.

In 1980 to encourage greater growth, the Chapter established the Harold Ennes Scholarship Fund Trust in his memory. The Scholarship Trust was transferred by the Chapter to the SBE national organization to administer in 1981.

Over the years, the purposes of the Trust were expanded. In addition to granting scholarships, the Trust now is involved with the funding and presentation of broadcast engineering-related educational programs, seminars and workshops. It also helps to underwrite costs associated with publishing technical books and manuals.

In 1994 the name of the Trust was changed to the Harold Ennes Educational Foundation Trust in order to reflect its expanded role. Some of the goals of the Trust are to encourage the entry of minorities and women into broadcast technical fields, to evaluate technical training courses and to act as a liaison with similar international organizations to develop and enhance common technical training courses.

== Sources ==
- Society of Broadcast Engineers
- Radio Magazine Online
- Broadcast Engineering Magazine
