= Innes =

Innes (/ˈɪnɪs/) is a habitational surname of Scottish origin, derived from Innes in Moray. In some cases it may have originated as a shortening of MacInnes.

== Surname ==
=== Finance ===
- Chris Innes (born 1970), businessperson, former Global Head of Equities and Derivatives at Bank of America, former American Head of Equities and Derivatives at BNP Paribas

=== Actors ===
- George Innes (born 1938), British actor
- Laura Innes (born 1959), American actress
- Scott Innes (born 1966), American author, songwriter, and voice actor

=== Artists ===
- Callum Innes (born 1962), Scottish abstract painter
- James Dickson Innes (1887–1914), Welsh painter

=== Authors and writers ===
- Hammond Innes (1914–1998), English author
- Henrietta Rose-Innes (born 1971), South African novelist
- James Innes (born 1975), English author
- Lyn Innes (born 1940), Australian academic and author
- Michael Innes, pseudonym of Scottish novelist J. I. M. Stewart (1906–1994)

=== Historians ===
- Cosmo Innes (1798–1874), Scottish historian and antiquary
- Thomas Innes (1662–1744), Scottish historian

=== Law and politicians ===
- Alfred Mitchell-Innes (1864–1950), British diplomat and economist
- Charles Alexander Innes (1874–1959), British colonial administrator
- Charles Hiller Innes (1870–1939), Massachusetts politician
- Frederick Innes (1816–1882), politician
- Harry Innes (1752–1816), federal judge
- Hugh Paterson Innes (1870–1931), lawyer and judge
- James Innes (Canadian politician) (1833–1903), journalist and businessman
- James Rose Innes (1855–1942), Chief Justice and politician of the Cape, South Africa
- John Innes (Toronto, Ontario politician) (died 1951), Scottish-Canadian politician in Toronto
- Malcolm Innes of Edingight (1938–2020), Scottish judge, Lord Lyon 1981–2001
- Reginald Long Innes (1869–1947), judge in Sydney, Australia
- Suzanne Innes-Stubb (born 1970), British-Finnish attorney, First Lady of Finland
- Ted Innes (1925–2010), Australian politician
- Thomas Innes of Learney (1893–1971), Scottish officer of arms, Lord Lyon 1945–1969

=== Military ===
- Archibald Clunes Innes (1800–1857), soldier and pastoralist
- James John McLeod Innes (1830–1907), military officer
- Veronica Volkersz (née Innes; 1917–2000), British World War II aviator

=== Musicians ===
- Andrew Innes (born 1962), Scottish musician
- Gary Innes (born 1980), Scottish musician
- Neil Innes (1944–2019), English musician

=== Religion ===
- John de Innes (c. 1370–1414), Scottish bishop
- Reginald Mitchell-Innes (1848–1930), Episcopalian priest
- Robert Innes (born 1959), bishop

=== Scientists ===
- Robert T. A. Innes (1861–1933), British-born South African astronomer
- William T. Innes (1874–1969), American writer, ichthyologist and publisher

=== Sports ===
- Albert Rose-Innes (1868–1946), South African cricketer
- Bob Innes (New Zealand footballer), New Zealand international football (soccer) player
- Bob Innes (Scottish footballer) (1878–1959), Scottish football (soccer) player
- Chris Innes (born 1976), Scottish football (soccer) player
- Craig Innes (born 1969), New Zealand rugby footballer
- Gerald Innes (1931–1982), South African cricketer
- Gordon Innes (1910–1992), New Zealand rugby union and rugby league player
- Mandy Mitchell-Innes (1914–2006), cricketer
- Mark Innes (born 1978), Scottish footballer
- Richard Innes (born 1953), cricketer

=== Other professions ===
- Euphemia Steele Innes, RRC, DN (1874–1955), Scottish nurse, matron of Leeds General Infirmary and 2nd Northern General Hospital, founded Leeds Nurses' League
- Jessie Rose Innes (1860–1943), South African nurse and suffragist
- John Innes (philanthropist) (1829–1904), British property developer and philanthropist
- John William Brodie-Innes (1848–1923), occultist

== Given name ==
- Innes Asher, New Zealand paediatrician
- Innes FitzGerald (born 2006), British athlete
- Innes Ireland (1930–1993), British military officer, engineer, and motor racing driver
- Innes Lloyd (1925–1991), Welsh television producer and actor
- Innes Hope Pearse (1889–1978), English medical doctor
- Innes Senior (born 2000), English-born professional rugby league footballer
- Innes Harold Stranger (1879–1936), British barrister and politician
- Innes Willox (born 1963), Australian journalist, diplomat, and lobbyist

== Middle name ==
- Augusta Innes Withers (1793–1877), English illustrator
- James Innes Randolph (1837–1887), American military officer and poet
- Reginald Innes Pocock (1863–1947), English zoologist
- William Innes Homer (1929–2012), American academic and author

== In fiction ==
- David Innes, fictional character by Edgar Rice Burroughs
- Rachel Innes, fictional character from The Circular Staircase by Mary Roberts Rinehart
