= Antonino Letteriello =

Italian data management executive (born 1979)

- Born: 11 August 1979 (age 47); Italy
- Education: Università di Bologna, Politecnica Valencia, University of Coimbra
- Occupations: Engineer, Data and Project management executive, Entrepreneur, and Academic
- Known for: Founder and chief executive officer of FIT data management consultancy Group
- Spouse: Renata Letteriello
- Children: 2
- Website: https://fitacademy.fit/

Antonino (Nino) Letteriello (born August 11, 1979, in Italy) is an Italian data management executive, entrepreneur, and academic. He is the founder and chief executive officer of FIT Group, a consultancy specializing in data governance and digital transformation.

Letteriello serves as President of the Italian Association of Data and Analytics Italy, the Italian chapter of the Data Management Association International (DAMA). Letteriello is also the European, Middle East and African Coordinator for DAMA International and a member of the MIT Chief Data Officer Symposium programme.. He is a regular contributor to Forbes.

== Career ==
Letteriello started his career as an engineer in the public transport industry in 2006, working for transport networks including Metropolitana Milanese and Transport for London before assuming the role of Head of Programme Management for the London 2012 Olympic and Paralympic Games. He was invited to the UK Olympic Expert Panel by then President of London 2012 Lord Coe.

He founded Enne Limited in 2014 which he sold in 2020 with the firm consisting of approximately 100 engineering staff. He then went on to found and became CEO of FIT Group. Since 2020, Letteriello has been a member of the Massachusetts Institute of Technology's CDO Symposium Programme Committee where Lectures and in 2021 was nominated United Nation High Level Facilitator Tracker for policy on building confidence and security in the use of ICTs. He has also written for the World Economic Forum, MIT Technology Review and Forbes.

Letteriello has played a key role in advancing professional data governance across Europe. As President of DAMA Italy and European Coordinator for DAMA International, he has promoted standards and education for responsible data management and analytics.

Letteriello is a professor at the University of Modena and Reggio Emilia, focusing on the intersection of economics, technology, and data strategy. He has published commentary and articles on ethical data management and digital innovation in leading professional outlets.

== Recognition ==
Holder of a Data Management Excellence Award, in 2020, Letteriello was nominated as one of the 2021 Data IQ 100 most influential people in data. He is also Co-founder and Chairman of the EU DATA think tank () www.data-emea.org.

== Personal life ==
Letteriello resides in Modena, Italy, with his wife, Renata, and their two children.

== Publications ==
• 20 Expert Tips For Sustaining Healthy Tech Team Motivation (co-authored), «Forbes», 22 August 2025, https://www.forbes.com/councils/forbestechcouncil/2025/08/22/20-expert-tips-for-sustaining-healthy-tech-team-motivation/

• From Regulation To Readiness: Meeting The AI Literacy Mandate, «Forbes», 22 August 2025, https://www.forbes.com/councils/forbestechcouncil/2025/08/22/from-regulation-to-readiness-meeting-the-ai-literacy-mandate/

• Reclaiming Human Thought in the Age of AI: Why Computational Thinking is the Most Important Skill You’re Not Learning (co-authored), «FIT Academy», August 2025, https://fitacademy.fit/wp-content/uploads/2025/07/White-Paper-Computational-Thinking.pdf

• Reclaiming Human Thought: Navigating Complexity With Computational Thinking, «Forbes», 18 July 2025, https://www.forbes.com/councils/forbestechcouncil/2025/07/18/reclaiming-human-thought-navigating-complexity-with-computational-thinking/

• E se le buone domande fossero il vero New Oil?, «MIT Technology Review Italia», 9 July 2025, https://www.technologyreview.it/e-se-le-buone-domande-fossero-il-vero-new-oil/

• There Are Too Many Answers Around. What We Need Are Good Questions (co-authored), «FIT Academy», July 2025, https://fitacademy.fit/wp-content/uploads/2025/07/White-Paper-Good-Questions.pdf

• Companies Are Missing The Chance To Improve The World With Their Data, «Forbes», 12 June 2025, https://www.forbes.com/councils/forbestechcouncil/2025/06/12/companies-are-missing-the-chance-to-improve-the-world-with-their-data/

• 20 Reasons Data Literacy Efforts Fail (And How To Address Them) (co-autohored), «Forbes», 11 June 2025, https://www.forbes.com/councils/forbestechcouncil/2025/06/11/20-reasons-data-literacy-efforts-fail-and-how-to-address-them/

• Your Data Can Save The World: Why You Should Care About Data for Good (co-authored), «FIT Academy», June 2025, https://fitacademy.fit/wp-content/uploads/2025/06/White-Paper-Data-for-Good.pdf

• Why Do So Many Data Science And AI Projects Fail? The Missing Human Factor, «Forbes», 21 April 2025, https://www.forbes.com/councils/forbestechcouncil/2025/04/21/why-do-so-many-data-science-and-ai-projects-fail-the-missing-human-factor/

• It’s Not Just the Tech: The People Behind Data Success or Failure (co-authored), «FIT Academy», April 2025, URL = https://fitacademy.fit/wp-content/uploads/2025/04/FIT_WhitePaper_April2025.pdf

• Nino Letteriello, il signore dei dati: “Così il flusso di informazioni può aiutare la nostra vita” (intervista), «Il Resto del Carlino», 28 April 2024, URL = https://www.ilrestodelcarlino.it/modena/cronaca/nino-letteriello-signore-dei-dati-4d14c427

• I cinque ostacoli più comuni nella gestione dei Big data nelle piccole e medie imprese, «Il Sole 24 Ore», 9 December 2023, URL = https://www.ilsole24ore.com/art/i-cinque-ostacoli-piu-comuni-gestione-big-data-piccole-e-medie-imprese-AF5NzLvB

• Modena, attacco hacker alla sanità. L’esperto: “Errori umani in nove attacchi su dieci” (intervista), «Gazzetta di Modena», 1 December 2023, https://www.gazzettadimodena.it/modena/cronaca/2023/12/01/news/modena-attacco-hacker-alla-sanita-l-esperto-errori-umani-in-nove-attacchi-su-dieci-1.100431935

• How can SMEs become data‑driven enterprises? (co-authored), «World Economic Forum», 25 June 2023, http://weforum.org/stories/2023/06/how-can-smes-become-data-driven-enterprises/

• Data Quality, automazione e CDO: ce ne parla Nino Letteriello (intervista), Tech from the Net, 2 September 2022, https://techfromthenet.it/2022/09/02/data-quality-automazione-e-cdo-ce-ne-parla-nino-letteriello/

• Data Erasers: the Strategic Team you don't have (yet), Forbes, 27 March 2026, https://www.forbes.com/councils/forbestechcouncil/2026/03/27/data-erasers-the-strategic-team-you-dont-have-yet/

• The Future of Data Management is already here, Forbes, 23 June 2026, https://www.forbes.com/councils/forbestechcouncil/2026/06/23/the-future-of-data-management-is-already-here/
