= William P. Ennis (general, born 1878) =

United States Army general

William Peirce Ennis
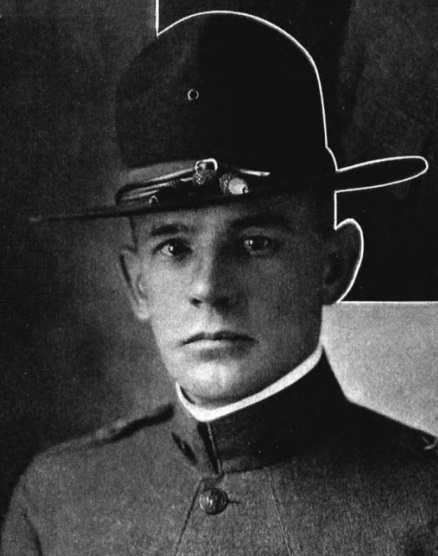
- Born: January 30, 1878; Presidio of San Francisco, California
- Died: July 28, 1968 (aged 90); Martha's Vineyard, Massachusetts
- Spouse: Eda Totten
- Children: William P. Ennis
- Military career
- Allegiance: United States
- Branch: United States Army
- Service years: 1901–1941
- Rank: Brigadier general
- Nickname: Roaring Bill
- Service number: 0-1331
- Conflicts: World War I
- Awards: Distinguished Service Medal

Signature
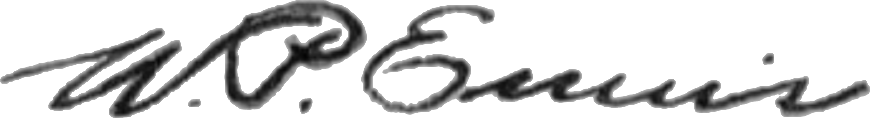

William Peirce Ennis (January 30, 1878 – July 28, 1968) was a United States Army officer in the early 20th century. He received the Distinguished Service Medal.

== Biography ==
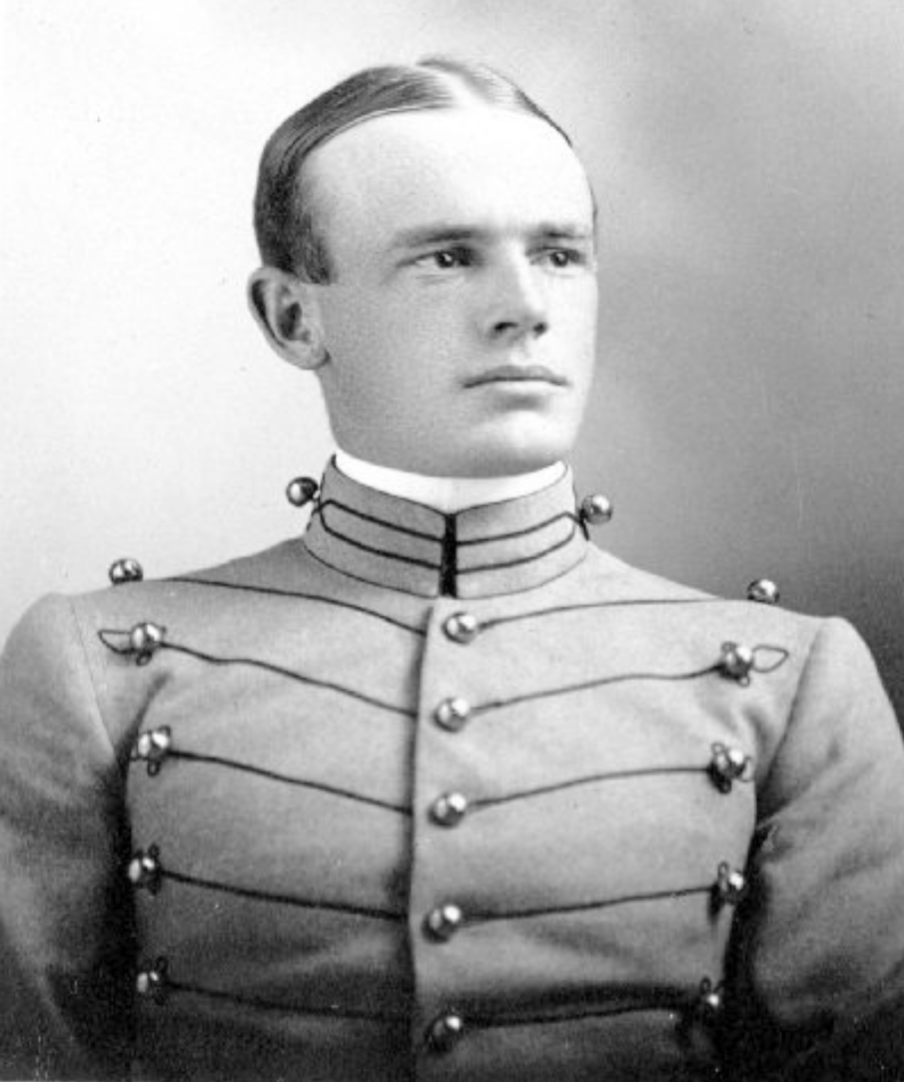
At West Point in 1901

Ennis was born in the Presidio of San Francisco on January 30, 1878, though he spent much of his early life in Newport, Rhode Island. His father, William Ennis, was a veteran of the American Civil War and Spanish–American War who attained the rank of brigadier general and from 1933 to 1938 was the oldest living graduate of the United States Military Academy at West Point. Ennis graduated from West Point in 1901 and was commissioned in the Artillery Corps.

Ennis served at Fort Hamilton from 1901 to 1904, West Point from 1904 to 1908, and at Fort Reno from 1908 to 1911. He was considered one of the best trainers of artillery horses in the country. Ennis went to the Philippines in 1912 with the First Battalion of the First Field Artillery, though he and the others rejoined the rest of the regiment in 1913. He returned to West Point in 1915 in order to command his artillery detachment. In late 1917, Ennis went to Fort Sill in order to serve as a senior instructor in the Department of Materiel of the School of Fire. He was promoted to colonel in May 1918 and served as the director of the Department of Materiel, for which he received the Army Distinguished Service Medal, the citation for which reads:

The President of the United States of America, authorized by Act of Congress, July 9, 1918, takes pleasure in presenting the Army Distinguished Service Medal to Brigadier General William Peirce Ennis, United States Army, for exceptionally meritorious and distinguished services to the Government of the United States, in a duty of great responsibility during World War I. As Director of the Department of Material, School of Fire, for Field Artillery at Fort Sill, Oklahoma, from 9 May 1918 to 30 August 1918, General Ennis' untiring energy, devotion to duty, and exceptional qualifications for the task he had to perform, were directly responsible for the splendid organization developed.

After Ennis's promotion to the rank of brigadier general on August 8, 1918, he assumed command over the 13th Field Artillery Brigade, 13th Division, stationed at Fort Lewis.

After World War I ended, Ennis reverted to the rank of major and spent six years as a student at the United States Army War College, and he served on the General Staff assignments. From 1922 to 1925, he served as a G-4 in Panama. From 1929 to 1931, Ennis commanded the Second Battalion of the 16th Field Artillery and afterward had General Staff duty in Boston. He commanded the 6th Field Artillery at Fort Hoyle in Maryland for three years. In addition to these positions, Ennis usually commanded the First Field Artillery Brigade and the post at the same time. Ennis' last assignment was as commander of the 82nd Infantry Division, which would be converted to an airborne division during World War II, from 1 September 1939 to 31 August 1941.

After retiring from the military in 1941, Ennis and his family moved to Martha's Vineyard, where they lived for 27 years. He died on July 28, 1968.

General Ennis was an hereditary companion of the District of Columbia Commandery of the Military Order of the Loyal Legion of the United States.

== Personal life ==
Ennis married Eda Totten on April 25, 1903. He is the father of William P. Ennis, who became a lieutenant general and served as the president of the Army War College.

== Bibliography ==
- Davis, Henry Blaine Jr. (1998). Generals in Khaki. Raleigh, North Carolina: Pentland Press. ISBN 1571970886. OCLC 40298151.
