= Mary Quayle Innis =

Canadian writer and historian (1899-1972)

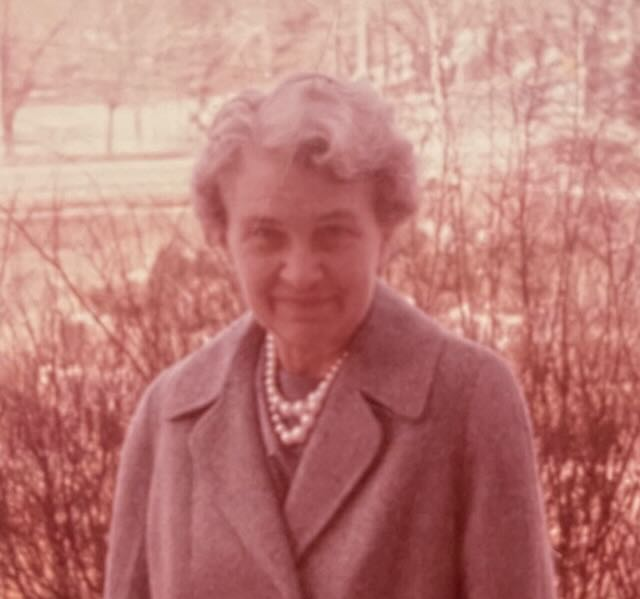
- Born: April 13, 1899; St. Marys, Ohio, United States
- Died: January 10, 1972 (aged 72); Toronto, Ontario, Canada
- Occupations: Novelist, short story writer, editor, researcher, historian
- Spouse: Harold Innis
- Children: Four, including Anne Innis Dagg and Donald Quayle Innis
- Writing career
- Notable work: An Economic History of Canada

Mary Emma Quayle Innis (April 13, 1899 – January 10, 1972) was a Canadian novelist, short story writer and author of historical works including An Economic History of Canada; three illustrated books for children about the country's founding; a history of the Canadian YMCA; and, Travellers West, an account of three 19th-century expeditions across western Canada. In addition, she researched and edited several books about women and Canadian history including a scholarly edition of Mrs. Simcoe's Diary, kept from 1791 to 1796, by Elizabeth Posthuma Simcoe, the wife of John Graves Simcoe, the first Lieutenant Governor of Upper Canada.

Innis worked with her husband, the Canadian economic historian Harold Innis, helping to edit his books for publication. She also contributed ideas that may have influenced his later work especially on the role of communications media in shaping civilizations. After his death in 1952, she helped edit and revise four of his works. For the second edition of Empire and Communications in 1972, she incorporated Innis's marginal notes in the footnotes, tracing and attributing quotations and expanding references.

Innis served as Dean of Women at the University of Toronto's University College from 1955 to 1964.

She received an honorary doctorate from Queen's University in 1958 and another from the University of Waterloo in 1965.

== Life ==
Mary Quayle Innis was born April 13, 1899, in St. Marys, Ohio. Her father Frederick Quayle worked for the Automatic Electric Company automating telephone systems so they would not require switchboard operators. As a result of his work, the family moved frequently finally settling in Wilmette, Illinois, where Mary attended New Trier High School. She enjoyed "carrying satisfying piles of books and notebooks" in a building that had "a library, an art room, an auditorium, and music classes" as well as inspiring teachers.

Mary began studying for a BA at the nearby University of Chicago in 1915, but took a leave to do war service in Washington in the summer of 1918. She was involved in organizing cargo space for shipping U.S. commodities in co-operation with its allies, England, France and Italy. In letters home, she described how "fascinatingly interesting" it was to be in charge of "tables and reports on trade and all sorts of commodities, blueprints of tonnage and shipping, etc. etc." The work led to an interest in economics. After returning to the university, she enrolled in a class in political economy taught by Harold Innis, a Canadian doctoral student who had fought in World War I. According to Innis biographer, Donald Creighton, she stood out among his students and realizing they shared the same interests, the young lecturer fell in love.

They were married in Wilmette in May 1921, and moved to Toronto, where Innis was a lecturer at the University of Toronto. Mary Innis typed his PhD thesis on the history of the Canadian Pacific Railway and helped organize the bibliography, footnotes, references and index. It was published as a book in 1923.

Together they had four children, Donald (1924), Mary (1927), Hugh (1930), and Anne (1933).

Innis published over eighty short stories along with a novel, four edited collections and several historical books and articles. She received an honorary doctorate from Queen's University in 1958 and another from the University of Waterloo in 1965.

Innis died in Toronto on January 10, 1972.

== Select bibliography ==
- Innis, Mary Quayle. An Economic History of Canada. Toronto: The Ryerson Press. 1935.
- Innis, Mary Quayle. Stand on a Rainbow. New York: Duell, Sloan and Pearce, 1944. "fiction, for a juvenile audience"
- Innis, Mary Quayle. Unfold the Years: A History of the Young Women's Christian Association in Canada. Toronto: McClelland and Stewart Ltd. 1949.
- Innis, Mary Quayle. Travellers West. Toronto: Clarke, Irwin. 1956.
- Innis, Mary Quayle. Mrs Simcoe's Diary. New York: St Martin's Press. 1965.
- Innis, Mary Quayle. The Clear Spirit. Twenty Canadian Women and Their Times. Published for the Canadian Federation of University Women by University of Toronto Press. Edited by Mary Quayle Innis. 1967.
- Innis, Mary Quayle, A. Cameron, J.H. Richards. Living in Canada. Toronto: Clarke, Irwin. 1968.
