= William P. Ennis (general, born 1904) =

U.S. Army lieutenant general

William P. Ennis Jr.
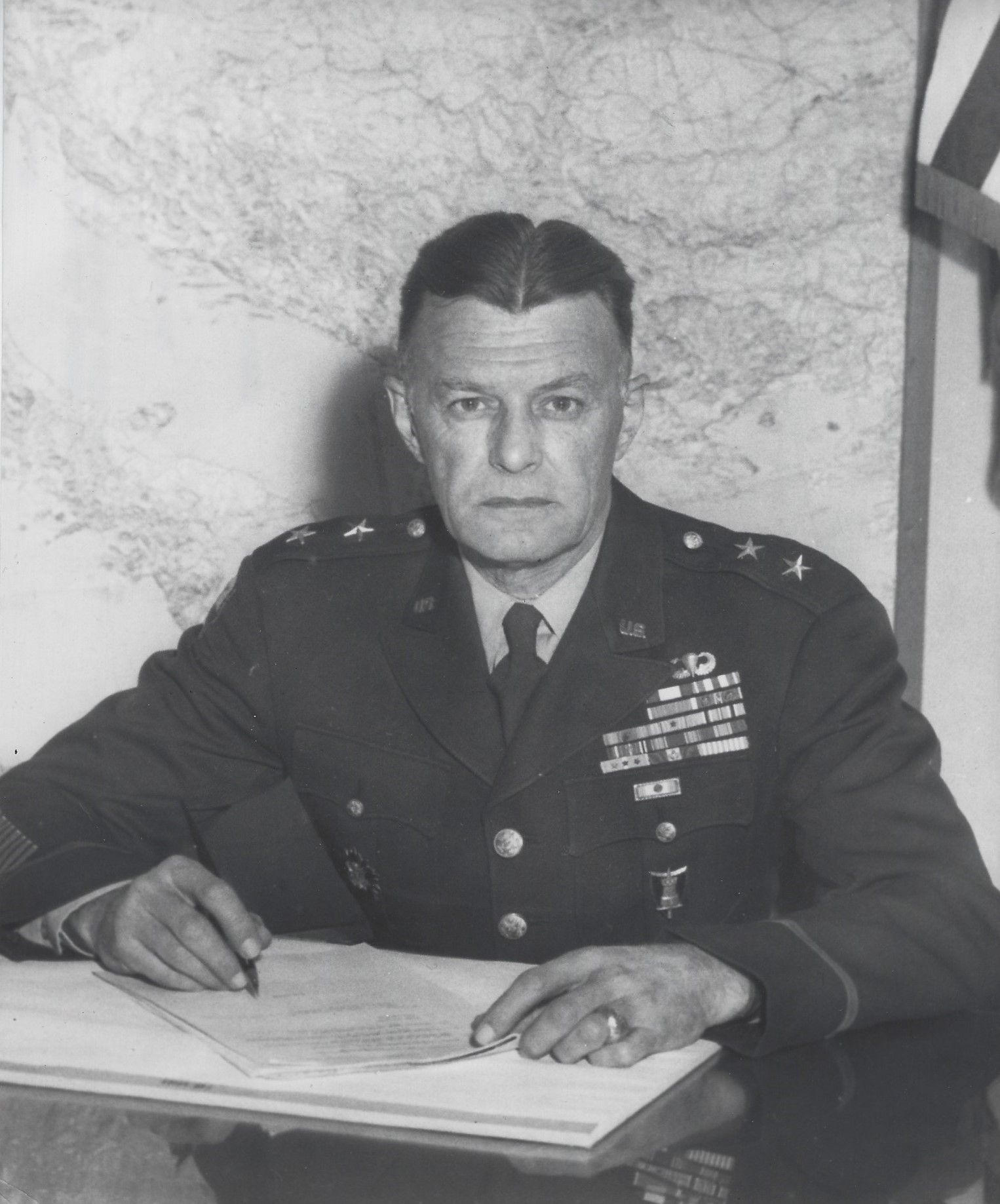
- Ennis circa 1960 as a major general and president of the Army War College
- Born: April 27, 1904; Fort Hamilton, New York, US
- Died: December 9, 1989 (aged 85); Boston, Massachusetts, US
- Burial place: Arlington National Cemetery
- Spouse: Frances Cassel Dwyer
- Children: 3
- Relatives: William P. Ennis (father)
- Military career
- Allegiance: United States
- Branch: United States Army
- Service years: 1926–1962
- Rank: Lieutenant general
- Conflicts: World War II; Korean War
- Awards: Distinguished Service Medal (2); Silver Star Medal; Legion of Merit; Bronze Star Medal (3); Air Medal (2)

William Peirce Ennis Jr. (April 27, 1904 – December 9, 1989) was a career officer in the United States Army who served as commandant of the Army War College and rose to the rank of lieutenant general.

== Early life ==
Ennis was born on April 27, 1904, at Fort Hamilton, New York, where his father, Lieutenant (later brigadier general) William P. Ennis Sr. (1878–1968), was stationed. His mother was Eda (Totten) Ennis. He was a direct descendant of Lieutenant William Ennis who served in the Continental Army during the American Revolution and was an original member of the Rhode Island Society of the Cincinnati.

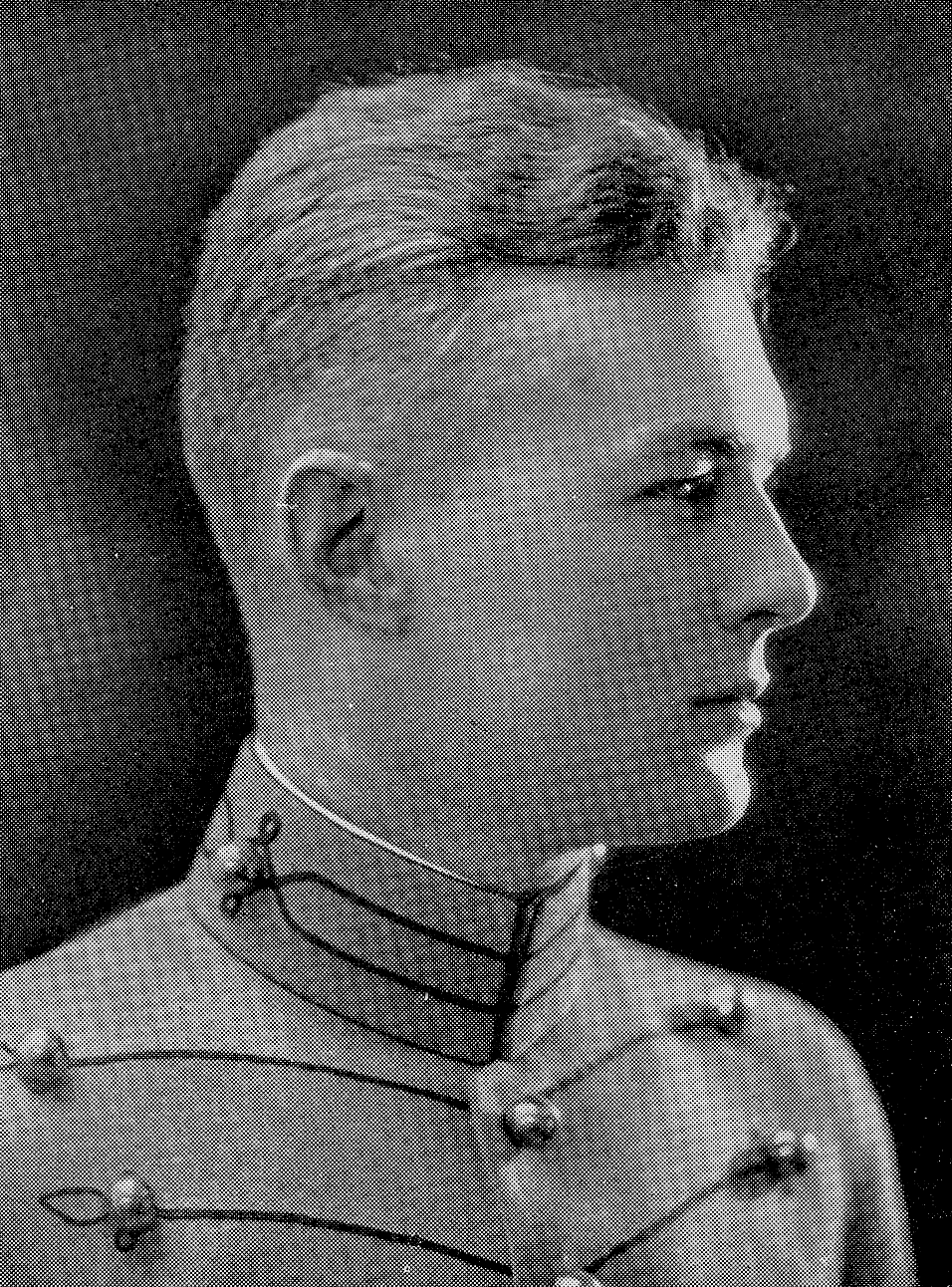
At West Point in 1926

He entered the United States Military Academy at West Point, New York, in 1922 and graduated in 1926. He had strong family ties to West Point as both his father and grandfather, Brigadier General William Ennis, were graduates of West Point. Like his father and grandfather, Ennis was commissioned as an Artillery officer and rose to become a general. On his mother's side of the family, he was the grandson of 1st Lieutenant C.A.L. Totten and the great-grandson of Brevet Brigadier General James Totten, both of whom were also graduates of West Point.

== Military career ==
Ennis married Frances Cassel Dwyer (1903–1994) on April 27, 1927, shortly after his graduation from West Point. He was stationed in the Philippines in the late 1920s. Ennis completed the Battery Officer's Basic Course at the Field Artillery School in 1931 and then served as a tactical officer at West Point from 1931 to 1936.

During World War II, Ennis graduated from the General Staff Course in 1942. He was promoted to colonel in November 1942 and then served in North Africa and Italy. In Italy he served as the assistant commander of the IV Corps Artillery in support of Free French forces. He was awarded the Legion of Merit and the Bronze Star Medal with two oak leaf clusters for his service during World War II. After the war, he attended the National War College, graduating in 1949.

During the Korean War, he commanded the X Corps Artillery during combat operations. For this service, he was awarded the Distinguished Service Medal, the Silver Star and two Air Medals.

He later commanded the division artillery of the 82nd Airborne Division and served with the American delegation to NATO headquarters. He was also commandant of the Army War College at Carlisle, Pennsylvania.

Ennis was promoted to lieutenant general on July 30, 1960, and was assigned as commanding officer of the Weapon Systems Evaluation Group in Washington, D. C. He retired from the Army on August 31, 1962, after 36 years of active service. He was awarded a second Distinguished Service Medal upon his retirement.

== Retirement and death ==
After his retirement, Ennis lived in Newport, Rhode Island. He died at Massachusetts General Hospital on December 9, 1989, at the age of 85. He was buried in Arlington National Cemetery.

== Awards ==
- Distinguished Service Medal with oak leaf cluster
- Silver Star
- Legion of Merit
- Bronze Star Medal with "V" device and two oak leaf clusters
- Air Medal with oak leaf cluster
- American Defense Service Medal
- European-African-Middle Eastern Campaign Medal
- World War II Victory Medal
- National Defense Service Medal
- Korean Service Medal with seven campaign stars
- Korean Presidential Unit Citation
- United Nations Korea Medal

== Dates of rank ==
- Cadet, USMA – July 1, 1922
- 2nd Lieutenant (RA) – June 12, 1926
- 1st Lieutenant (RA) – December 1, 1931
- Captain (RA) – June 12, 1936
- Major (AUS) – January 31, 1941
- Lieutenant Colonel (AUS) – February 1, 1942
- Colonel (AUS) – November 10, 1942
- Major (RA) – June 12, 1945
- Lieutenant Colonel (RA) –
- Major General (AUS) – February 23, 1950
- Colonel (RA) – May 15, 1950
- Brigadier General (AUS) – April 15, 1951
- Major General (RA) – April 1, 1955
- Lieutenant General (RA) – July 30, 1960
- Retired – July 31, 1962
