= William Ennis (general, born 1841) =

American Brigadier General (1841–1939)

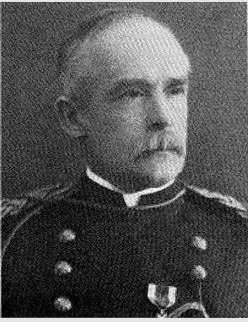
- From 1939's Seventieth Annual Report of the Association of the Graduates of the United States Military Academy
- Born: December 26, 1841; Newport, Rhode Island, U.S.
- Died: September 30, 1938 (aged 96); Newport, Rhode Island, U.S.
- Burial place: Island Cemetery, Newport, Rhode Island
- Spouse: Andrine Luelle Peirce (m. 1871–1938)
- Children: 4 (including William P. Ennis)
- Relatives: William P. Ennis (grandson)
- Military career
- Allegiance: United States
- Service: United States Army
- Service years: 1864–1905
- Rank: Brigadier General
- Unit: U.S. Army Field Artillery Branch
- Commands: Battery of St. Francis Barracks; Battery of Fort McPherson; Battery of Washington Barracks; Siege Artillery Battalion, Fifth Army Corps; Camp McKinley, Hawaii; Artillery District of Baltimore; Artillery District of Narragansett
- Wars: American Civil War; American Indian Wars; Spanish–American War

William Ennis (December 26, 1841 – September 30, 1938) was a career officer in the United States Army. A veteran of the American Civil War, American Indian Wars, and Spanish–American War, he attained the rank of brigadier general, and was most notable for his command of several Field Artillery and Coast Artillery posts and districts.

A native of Newport, Rhode Island, Ennis was educated in local public and private schools before attending the United States Military Academy at West Point, from which he graduated in 1864. Commissioned a second lieutenant of Field Artillery, Ennis served in the Union Army at the end of the American Civil War and participated in campaigns and battles in Tennessee and Alabama, in addition to the Defenses of Washington.

After the war, Ennis served in Field Artillery and Coast Artillery assignments of increasing rank and responsibility throughout the United States, in addition to long service as aide-de-camp to General John Schofield. While serving in California in the late 1870s, he participated in campaigns of the Nez Perce War and Bannock War. During the Spanish–American War, he commanded a siege artillery battalion during combat in Cuba. After returning to the United States he commanded the Artillery District of Baltimore and Artillery District of Narragansett, and was promoted to colonel in April 1903. On November 7, 1905, Ennis was promoted to brigadier general under the provisions of a law permitting Union Army veterans still on active duty to be advanced one grade before retiring, and he retired the same day, shortly before reaching the mandatory retirement age of 64.

In retirement, Ennis resided in Newport. He died in Newport on September 30, 1938. Ennis was buried at Island Cemetery in Newport.

== Early life ==
William Ennis was born in Newport, Rhode Island on December 26, 1841, the son of attorney William Ennis (1801–1849) and Eliza Ann (Whitehorne) Ennis (1803–1894). He was educated in the public and private schools of Newport, and began attendance at the United States Military Academy (West Point) in 1860. Ennis graduated in June 1864, and was ranked 20th of 27. He received his commission as a second lieutenant of Field Artillery and joined the Union Army during the American Civil War.

== Start of career ==
Assigned to the 4th Artillery, Ennis served in the Franklin–Nashville campaign, including the Defenses of Nashville, Second Battle of Franklin, and Battle of Nashville. He received a brevet promotion to first lieutenant on November 30, 1864, to recognize his meritorious service at Franklin. From December 1864 to January 1865, Ennis took part in the pursuit of the Confederate force commanded by John Bell Hood.

Ennis was part of the Union garrison at Huntsville, Alabama in January and February 1865, and Bridgeport, Alabama from February to March. In March 1865, he was promoted to brevet captain to recognize his meritorious service at Nashville. From March to June 1865, Ennis took part in the Defenses of Washington. On April 15, 1865, Ennis and another officer, Isaac W. MacLay, were at Ford's Theatre to see the play Our American Cousin. They were in their seats approximately six or seven rows from the stage when the Assassination of Abraham Lincoln by John Wilkes Booth took place. Many years later, Ennis stated in an interview that MacLay and he saw Booth run across the stage, but were not immediately aware Lincoln had been shot. MacLay subsequently assisted in carrying Lincoln across the street to the Petersen House. Ennis attempted to learn what had happened, and heard rumors of assassination attempts on other officials. Unable to obtain an accurate account, Ennis returned to his unit's encampment, where he learned the next day what had occurred.

Following the end of the Civil War, Ennis served with his regiment at Fort Brown near Brownsville, Texas from June 1865 to January 1866. He was promoted to first lieutenant in May 1866. Ennis served at Fort Wayne, Michigan from January to November 1866. From November 1866 to June 1868, Ennis served as aide-de-camp to Major General John Schofield during Schofield's command of the First Military District. When Schofield served as United States Secretary of War from June 1868 to March 1869, Ennis served on the War Department staff.

== Continued career ==
Schofield subsequently commanded the Department of the Missouri (March 1869 – March 1870) and Military Division of the Pacific (March 1870 – July 1876), and Ennis served as his aide-de-camp from March 1869 to April 1875. From May 1875 to May 1876, he attended the Field Artillery School at Fort Monroe, Virginia. He served with his regiment at the Presidio of San Francisco, California from July 1876 to November 1881. During his service in the western United States, Ennis took part in the 1877 Nez Perce War and Bannock War of 1878. While participating in a skirmish against the Bannocks in Idaho, he was temporarily blinded by alkali dust, which required him to return to the Presidio to recuperate.

Ennis served with the 4th Artillery at Fort Adams, Rhode Island from November 1881 to May 1889. He served as regimental adjutant from April to October 1887, and was promoted to captain in October 1887. From October 1887 to October 1889, he served with his regiment at Fort McPherson, Georgia.

From October 1889 to May 1891, he commanded the battery at St. Francis Barracks, Florida. From May 25, 1891, to May 1893, Ennis commanded the battery at Fort McPherson. He commanded the battery at Washington Barracks, D.C. from May 1893 to May 1898.

== Later career ==
At the start of the Spanish–American War, Ennis was assigned to Tampa, Florida as commander of a battalion of siege artillery that was part of Fifth Army Corps. He organized and trained his battery in May and June 1898, then traveled with the battalion to Daiquirí and Santiago. In July, he was promoted to temporary lieutenant colonel. In Cuba, Ennis was assigned as provost marshal of forces stationed at Daiquirí.

After returning to United States, he resumed command of the battery at Washington Barracks. In December 1898 he reverted to his permanent rank of captain. In February 1899, Ennis testified at the military court of inquiry that investigated the United States Army beef scandal. According to Ennis, he heard no complaints about the canned beef issued to the army during the war, but often found that he could not eat himself because it left him nauseated. Upon making inquiries of soldiers after their return to the United States, Ennis found that they refused to eat the canned beef because it caused them to vomit. According to his testimony, soldiers did not complain to him at the time because they had enough food besides the tainted beef to keep from going hungry, and because the army in Cuba quickly switched to fresh beef after hostilities ended.

In March 1899, he was promoted to major. Ennis performed temporary staff duty at Fort Monroe from May to September 1899. He was on recruiting duty in Harrisburg, Pennsylvania from October 1899 to January 1900. Ennis commanded Camp McKinley, Hawaii from January 1900 to April 1901. He commanded the Artillery District of Baltimore from July 1901 to August 1902, and was promoted to lieutenant colonel in August 1901. Ennis served in the office of the Adjutant General of the United States Army from August 1902 to April 1903, when he was promoted to colonel.

Ennis commanded the Artillery District of Narragansett at Fort Adams from May 1903 to November 1905. On November 7, 1905, he was promoted to brigadier general under the provisions of a law permitting Union Army veterans still on active duty to be advanced one grade. He retired the same day, a few weeks before reaching the mandatory retirement age of 64.

== Retirement and death ==
In retirement, Ennis was a resident of Newport. In addition to membership in the Military Order of the Loyal Legion of the United States, Ennis subscribed to the Newport Reading Room and was a member of the West Point Mess and Fort Monroe Club. From 1933 to 1938, Ennis was West Point's oldest living graduate. In 1933, he broke his hip in a fall from his car; given his age, physicians feared the injury would prove fatal, but Ennis made a full recovery.

In 1926, the U.S. Congress enacted a law permitting West Point and United States Naval Academy graduates to be awarded Bachelor of Science (BS) degrees. In 1937, this provision was extended to individuals who had graduated before 1926. As a result, Ennis was awarded his BS at his home by Colonel Clement H. Wright, an Army officer then serving as an instructor at the Naval War College in Newport.

Ennis died in Newport on September 30, 1938. Honorary pallbearers at his funeral included Rear Admiral Ralph Earle and Professor Richard P. Strong. Attendees included Newport Mayor Henry S. Wheeler and his wife, Carole Garnett-Wheeler. Ennis was buried at Island Cemetery in Newport.

== Family ==
In March 1871, Ennis married Andrine Luella Peirce of Boston. They were the parents of four children, two of whom lived to adulthood. Daughter Clara was a longtime resident of Newport and was long active in civic and charitable causes.

Son William P. Ennis was a career army officer who attained the rank of brigadier general. William P. Ennis, the son of William Peirce Ennis, was also a career army officer, and he attained the rank of lieutenant general.

== Effective dates of rank ==
The dates of Ennis's promotions were:

- Second Lieutenant, June 13, 1864
- First Lieutenant (Brevet), November 30, 1864
- First Lieutenant, May 8, 1866
- Captain, October 5, 1887
- Lieutenant Colonel (temporary), July 18, 1898
- Captain, December 31, 1898
- Major, March 18, 1899
- Lieutenant Colonel, August 1, 1901
- Colonel, April 17, 1903
- Brigadier General, November 7, 1905
- Brigadier General (Retired), November 7, 1905
