= John Ennis (artist) =

American painter

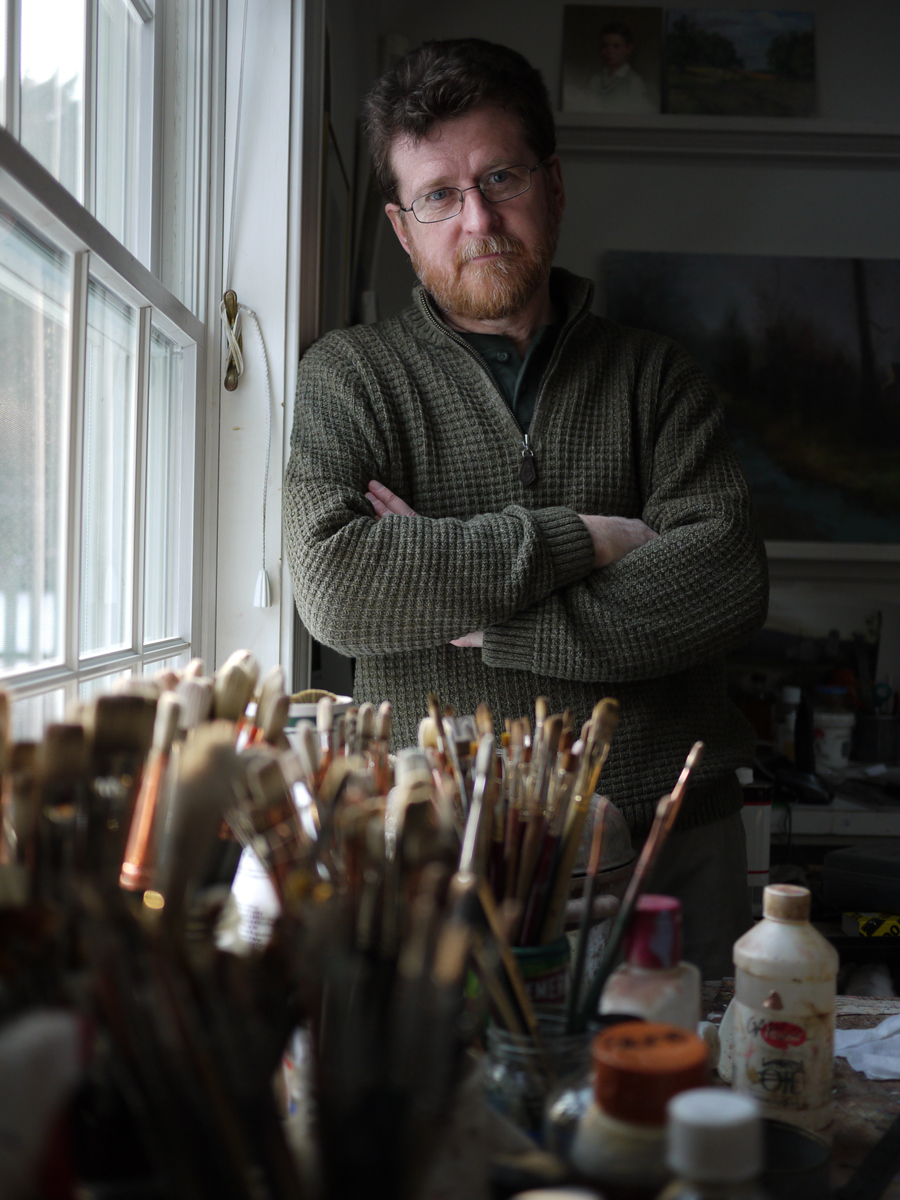
- Ennis in 2010
- Born: Bucks County, Pennsylvania
- Education: Maryland Institute College of Art, Art Students League
- Known for: Painting

John Ennis (born 1953) is an American painter. Ennis is a portrait painter and former book-cover illustrator; his paintings currently hang in over 100 fine art collections worldwide. He has over a thousand published book cover illustrations to his credit.

== Background ==
He graduated with a Bachelor of Fine Arts from the Maryland Institute College of Art, and studied painting at the Art Students League of New York under Jack Faragasso and Robert Emil Shulz and privately with Michael Aviano, all former students of Frank J. Reilly.[1] Reilly had studied with renowned Art Students League teacher Frank Vincent Dumond (1865-1951), a student of Benjamin Constant (1845-1902), Jules Joseph Lefebvre (1836-1911) and Gustave Boulanger (1824-1888), all painters of the French Academic Tradition.

== Life and work ==
Establishing a career in the 1980s as a freelance book cover illustrator, John Ennis illustrated for American publishers including Random House and its subsidiaries, Ballantine Books, Bantam Books, and Dell Books. Also other American publishers including Kensington Books, Dorchester Publishing, Berkley Books, Harper Collins, Penguin Books, New American Library, Pocket Books and Canadian publisher Harlequin Enterprises. Trained as an oil painter, Ennis used this medium for illustration until the mid-1990s. He helped pioneer digital illustration by introducing it to the book publishing industry as an illustration medium. In 1997, he authored the book Going Digital, An Artist's Guide to Computer Illustration published by Madison Square Press. In the same year, he served on the faculty of the Macworld Expo in Boston. He was interviewed for an article in Newsweek magazine for the article "Throw Out The Brushes". In 2002, Ennis left illustration and returned to oil painting as a fine artist. The Portrait Society of America awarded Ennis a Certificate of Merit in 2003, the Honors Award in 2004, First Place for his self-portrait in 2005, and another Honors Award in 2006. He went on to paint several hundred private and institutional portraits winning numerous national awards. His portrait subjects include Penn Medicine CEO Ralph Muller, Superintendent of the United States Naval Academy Vice Admiral John R. Ryan, FAA Administrator Randy Babbitt, oncologist Dr. Stephen Hahn, NIEHS Director Dr. Linda Silber Birnbaum, M.I.T. Nobel Laureate Susumu Tonegawa, notable corporate leaders Al McNeill of Turner Corporation, and John Bryson of Southern California Edison, noted philanthropists William and Joan Schreyer, the first woman headmaster of Boston Latin School, Cornelia Kelley, and the first African American Dean of University of South Carolina Law School, Burnele Powell.

== Awards ==
- Philadelphia Sketch Club Medal for achievements in the visual arts 2022
- Portrait Society of America: Honorable Mention, Member Competition, Commissioned Portraits 2014
- Portrait Society of America: 10th Honorable Mention, Member Competition 2013
- Portrait Society of America: 6th Place, Member Competition, Commissioned Portraits 2013
- Portrait Society of America: Certificate of Excellence, international competition 2009
- Portrait Society of America: Honorable Mention Men, Member Competition 2009
- Portrait Society of America: Fifth Place Children, Member Competition 2009
- Portrait Society of America: Honors Award, international competition 2006
- Portrait Society of America: Finalist, Children's Portrait Competition 2006
- Portrait Society of America: First Place, Self-Portrait Competition 2005
- Portrait Society of America: Honors Award international competition 2004
- Portrait Society of America: Best Portfolio, Annual Conference 2004, 2005, 2007
- Portrait Society of America: Certificate of Recognition, international competition 2003
- The Artist's Magazine's 26th Annual Art Competition: Finalist-Portrait & Figures
- The Artists Magazine's 24th Annual Art Competition: Finalist-Portrait & Figures
- The Artists Magazine's 22nd Annual Art Competition: Finalist-Portrait & Figures
- The Artists Magazine's 21st Annual Art Competition: Finalist-Portrait & Figures
- The Artists Magazine's 21st Annual Art Competition: First Place-Animal Art
- Woodmere Art Museum Annual Juried Show: Award for Portraiture
- Phillips' Mill 77th Annual Fall Exhibition: Patrons' Award
