= Majid Samii =

Iranian neurosurgeon (born 1937)

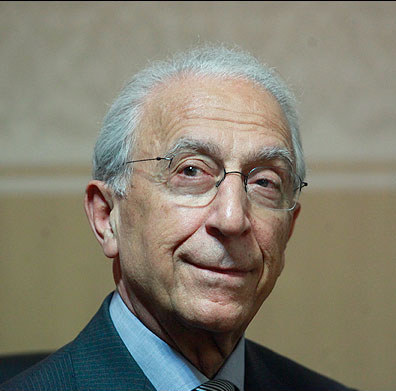
- Samii in 2014
- Born: 19 June 1937 (age 89); Tehran, Iran
- Education: University of Mainz
- Spouse: Mahshid Samii (m. 1960)
- Children: 2
- Awards: Rudolf Frey Award (2000); Paul C. Bucy Award (2003); Avicenna Award (2006); INC Award (2006); Iranian Science and Culture Hall of Fame (2006); Leibniz-Ring-Hannover Award (2013); WIPO Award (World Intellectual Property Organization) (2014); Golden Neuron Award (2014); Kharazmi International Award (2014)
- Scientific career
- Fields: Neurosurgery
- Workplaces: International Neuroscience Institute

Majid Samii (Persian: مجید سمیعی, born 19 June 1937) is an Iranian neurosurgeon and medical scientist.

== Biography ==
Samii was born in Tehran, Iran on 19 June 1937. After having completed his high school education in Iran, he moved to Germany, where he started his medical studies at the University of Mainz.

He has been the president of the International Society for Neurosurgery and was elected as the founding president of MASCIN – "Madjid Samii Congress of International Neurosurgeons" in 2003. Samii received the "Physician" award by the north German city of Hanover. Former German chancellor Gerhard Schröder hailed the 70-year-old Samii for his medical contribution to neuroscience as head of the International Neuroscience Institute (INI), based in Hanover.

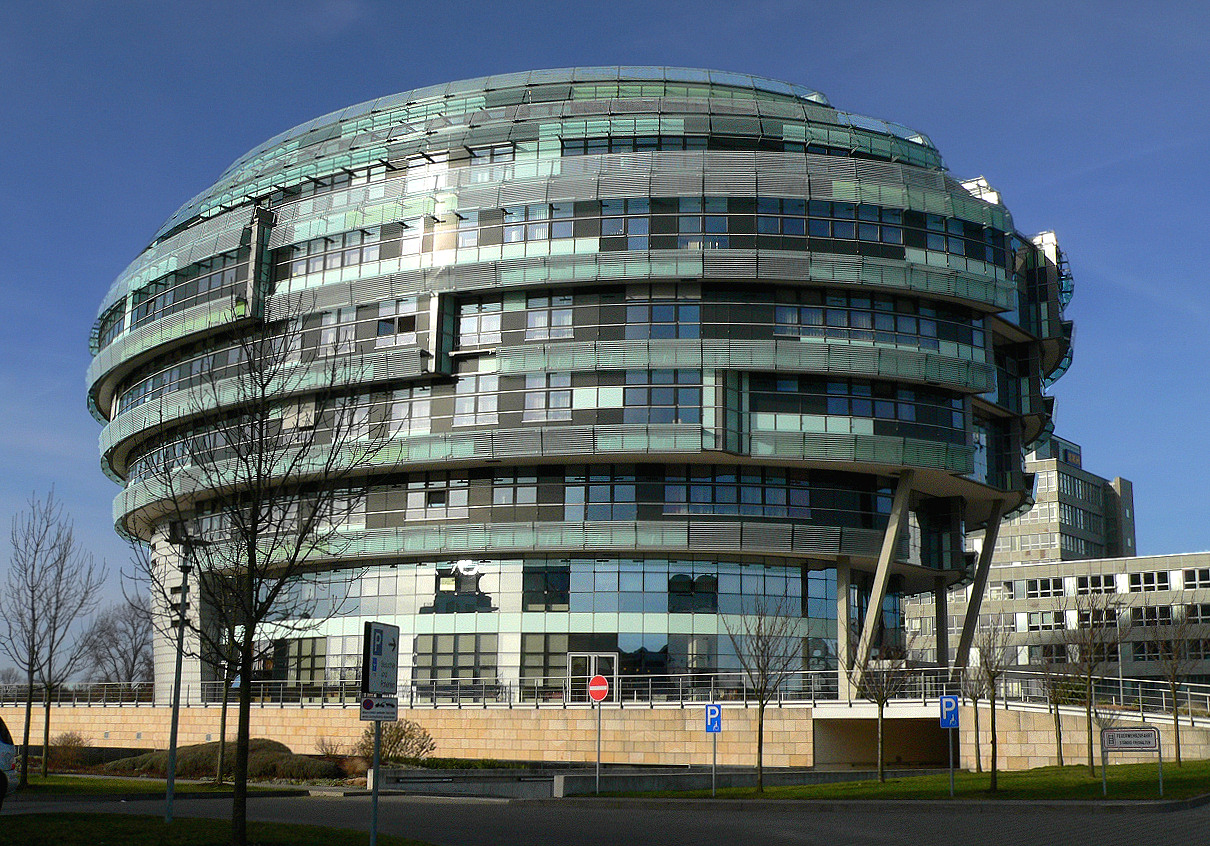
International Neuroscience Institute (in Deutsch) in Hannover, founded by Samii

He is the president of the International Neuroscience Institute (INI). In 2007, he received the "Friendship Award", from the Prime minister of China for his contribution to the medical progress of the country.

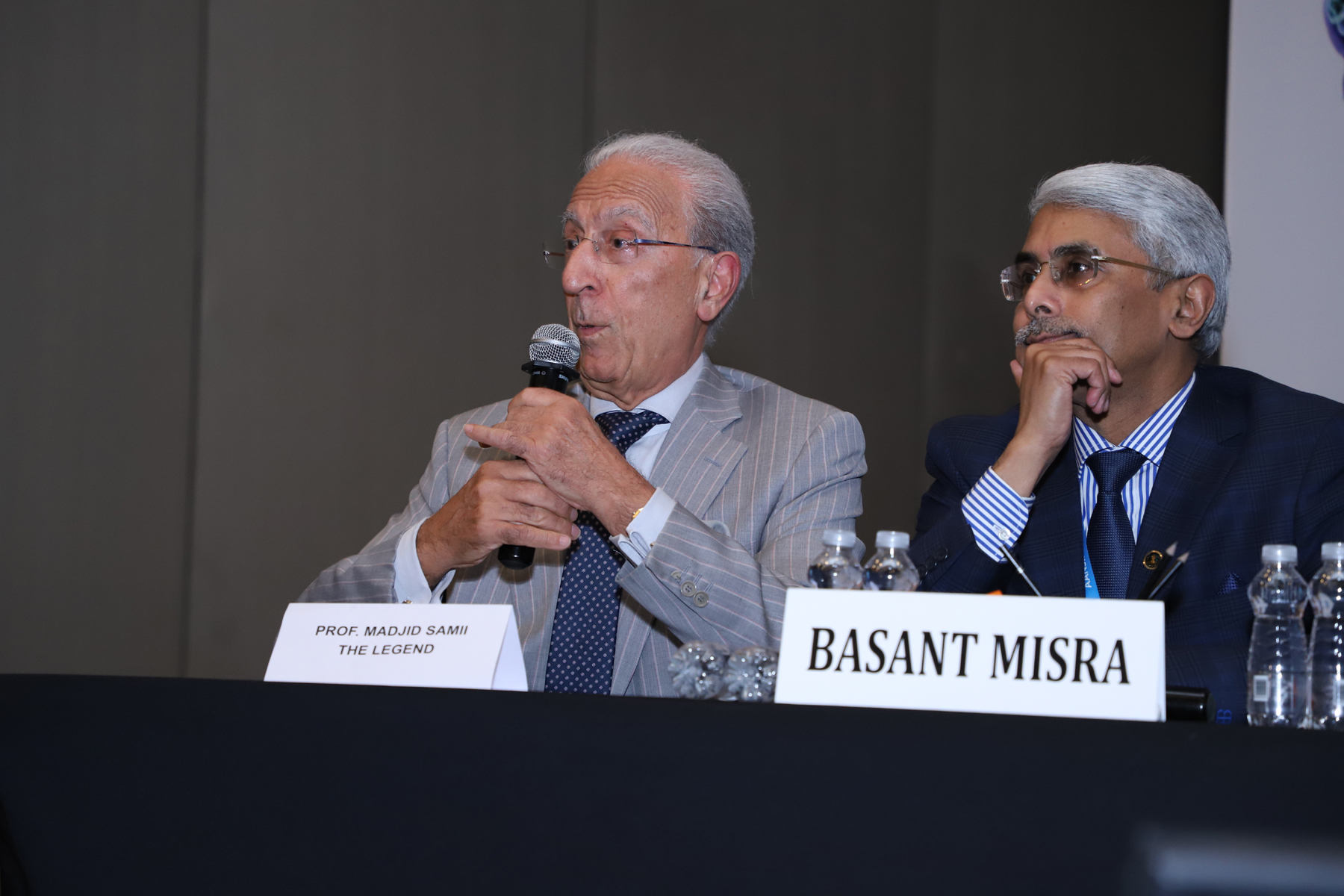
Prof. Samii in India in 2019

He had earlier received the 2014 Leibniz Ring Prize in Berlin. In 2011, World Federation of Neurosurgical Societies coined a medal of honor bearing Samii's name which would be given to outstanding neurosurgeons every two years. The first awardee of this medal was Prof. Maurice Choux from France.

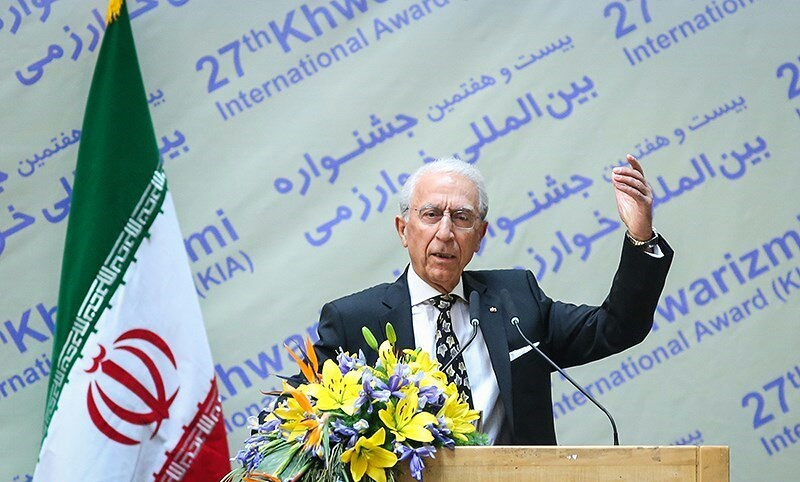
Samii speaking at the 5th Symposium of World Federation of Neurology, Milad Tower, Tehran

In recent years, he accepted Mahmoud Hashemi Shahroudi, Chief Justice of Iran, and Hossein-Ali Nayyeri, head of the disciplinary court of judges, in his private clinic in Hanover.

== Present duties ==
- President of the International Neuroscience Institute (INI) at Otto von Guericke University
- President of the China INI at Capital University in Beijing
- President of the Neurobionic Foundation
- President of the Board of Trustees of AWD Children's Assistance Foundation
- Director emeritus of the Neurosurgical Clinic, Nordstadt Hospital in Hannover
- Honorary President of the World Federation of Neurosurgical Societies (WFNS)
- Honorary President of the World Federation of Neurosurgical Societies Endowment/Foundation (WFNS)
- Honorary President of the German Society of Skull Base Surgery
- Honorary President of CURAC - German Society of Computer and Robot-Assisted Surgery
- Ambassador of African Neurosurgery

== Awards ==
- 2001: Honorary President of The World Federation of Neurosurgical Societies
- 2005: Carl Zeiss Honorary Lecture and Visiting Professorship initiated and hosted by the Department of Neurosurgery of the Johann Wolfgang Goethe-University, Frankfurt am Main, Germany
- 2006: Iranian Science and Culture Hall of Fame
- World Physician 2007
- 2008: Friendship Award of the People's Republic of China.
- 2010: Neurosurgical Society of America Medal Recipient.
- 2013: Leibniz-Ring-Hannover Prize winner.
- 2013: Neurosurgeon of the Year: Elected by the World Neurosurgery journal.
- 2014: World top neurosurgeon and Golden Neuron Award Winner.
- 2017: Awarded Honorary Doctorate title by Uskudar University for his valuable global researches and clinical contributions in Neuroscience.
