= Ennes =

Ennes may refer to:

- Ennes, the former name of Mount Olympus, Indiana

== People ==
- Charlotta Skjöldebrand (1791–1866), Swedish court official, born Charlotta Ennes
- Harold E. Ennes, American broadcasting pioneer
- James Ennes, retired United States Navy Lieutenant Commander involved in the 1967 USS Liberty incident
- Willem Ennes (died 2012), Dutch musician and member of Solution
- Thiago Ennes (born 1996), a Brazilian footballer
