= International Neuroscience Institute =

Research institute and hospital in Hanover, Germany

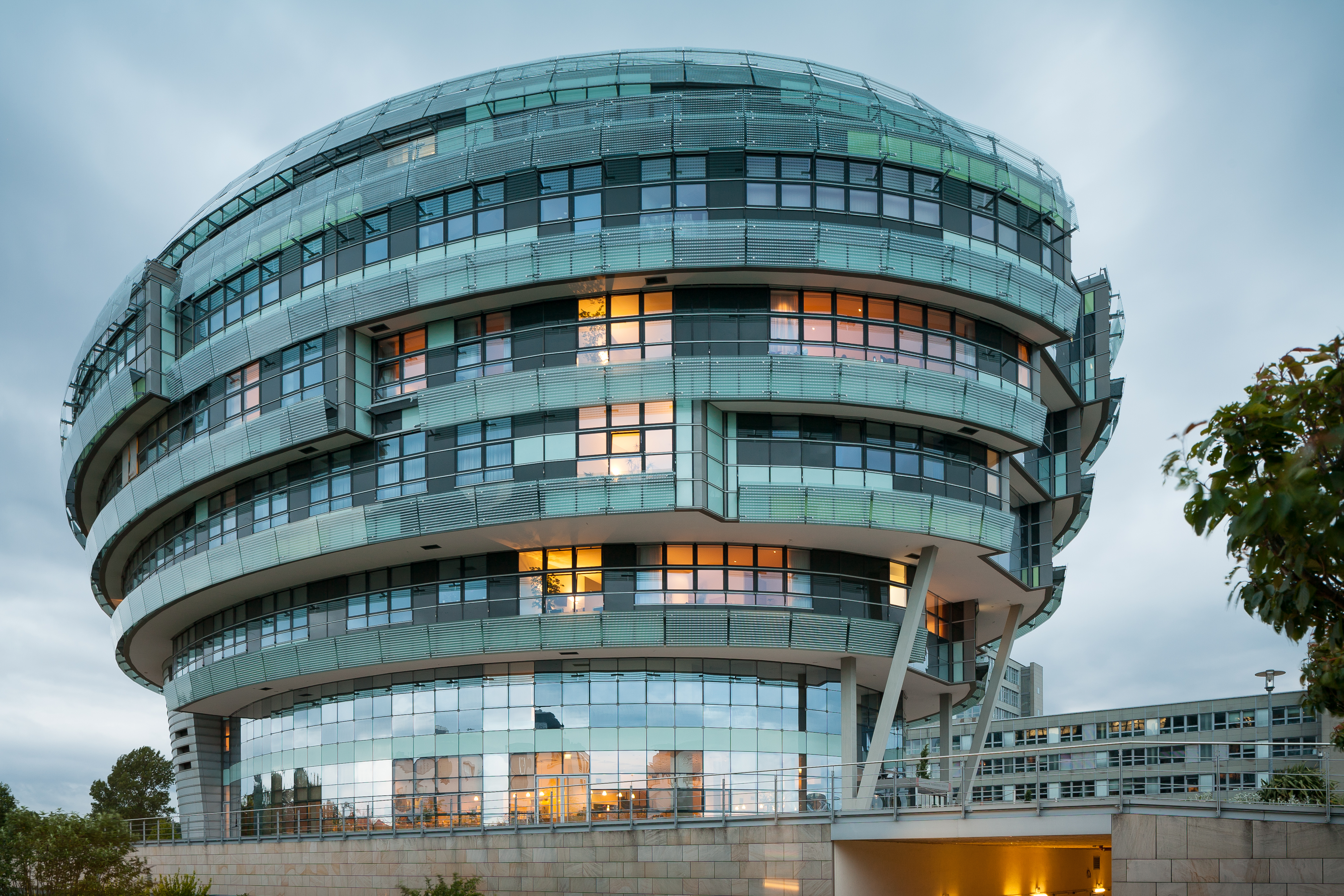
- Company type: GmbH, hospital, institute
- Founded: 1998
- Founder: Majid Samii
- Headquarters: 52°23′25.2″N 9°47′54.0″E
- Website: www.ini-hannover.de

International Neuroscience Institute (INI) is an international research institute and hospital in Hanover, Germany. In this hospital treatments contain treating diseases of brain, spinal cord diseases, diseases of peripheral nerves, tumors and etcetera. In addition, animal testing can also be performed.

The building's design, often cited as a prime example of iconic, literal architectural representation, is a visual metaphor shaped explicitly to resemble the human brain. "The INI was planned and constructed at the occasion of the World Exposition 2000 in Hannover, Germany . As an exhibition object it represented state of the art medical technology dedicated to diagnosis and treatment of disorders of the nervous system."
