= The Cod Fisheries: The History of an International Economy =

Published 1940

The Cod Fisheries: The History of an International Economy is a 1940 book by Harold Innis.

After the publication of his book The Fur Trade in Canada (1930) Innis turned to a study of an earlier staple — the cod fished for centuries off the eastern coasts of North America.

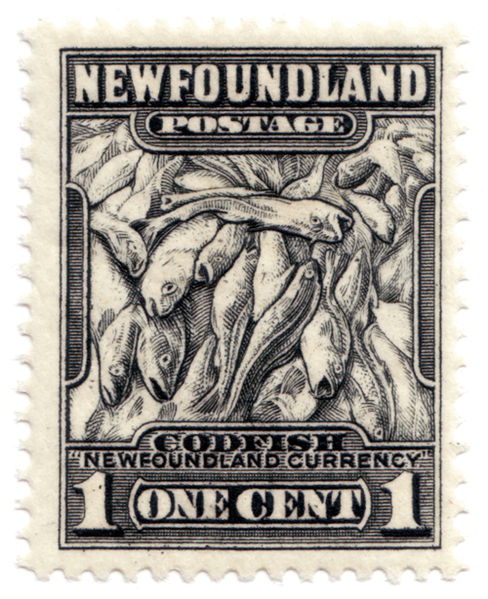
Cod on a 1932 Newfoundland postage stamp.

The result was The Cod Fisheries: The History of an International Economy, published 10 years after the fur trade study. Innis tells the detailed history of competing empires in the exploitation of a teeming, natural resource—a history that ranges over five hundred years. He begins by citing a report recounting John Cabot's 1497 voyage to North America that marvels about how "the sea there is swarming with fish, which can be taken not only with the net but in baskets let down with a stone, so that it sinks in the water." This abundance attracted various European nations, but Spain dominated the fishery until the defeat of the Spanish Armada in 1588. The British then took over with the French and later, American colonists, as their main rivals.

Throughout his 590-page study, Innis focuses on the complex inter-relationships among economics, culture and technology. He writes, for example, that the English were able to dominate the fishery after developing a method of curing their catches onshore, then transporting the dried fish to Mediterranean countries where there was a demand for a higher protein diet. This combined with consumer preferences for dried fish over cod packed in brine meant higher prices, especially in Catholic countries where the church required the regular consumption of fish. Thus, dried cod sold in Spain allowed England to receive substantial amounts of the precious metals that the Spanish were bringing from their colonies in the New World. "Cod from Newfoundland was the lever by which she [England] wrested her share of the riches of the New World from Spain."

Innis shows how the cod fishery was interwoven economically with the slave trade and international markets for such other products as sugar, tobacco and rum. He argues that rivalry between the British and the colonists in New England led to the American Revolution. While his study of the fur trade focused on the continental interior with its interlocking rivers and lakes, The Cod Fisheries looks outward at global trade and empire showing the far-reaching effects of one staple product, both on imperial centres and on marginal colonies such as Newfoundland, Nova Scotia and New England. Biographer, John Watson argues that the book foreshadowed Innis's later work exploring the relationships between communications technologies and the rise and fall of empires.

== Significance ==
Scholars have recognized Innis's extensive research on the cod fisheries as a seminal contribution to understanding its "role in the international economy and in the ebb and flow of empires" as well as in "the honing of a new, more critical perspective on economic development." After Innis's death, his colleague W. A. Mackintosh wrote that the depth of research in this book as well as in The Fur Trade in Canada would make them useful reference works "in the next century and beyond."
