= Robin Neill =

Canadian economic historian

Robin Foliet Neill
- Born: 1931; Thunder Bay, Ontario
- Died: 29 June 2014 (aged 82–83); Rocky Point, Prince Edward Island
- Resting place: Prince Edward Island
- Education: University of Toronto
- Spouse: Sharon
- Children: Natalie
- Scientific career
- Fields: Economic historian
- Workplaces: Carleton University; University of Prince Edward Island

Robin F. Neill (1931–2014) was a Canadian economic historian who was a longstanding professor at Carleton University in Ottawa and then, latterly, at the University of Prince Edward Island.

Born in 1931 in Thunder Bay, Ontario, Robin Neill held a B.A. and M.A. in political economy from the University of Toronto and a PhD in economics from Duke. His academic appointments included the University of Saskatchewan, 1960–69; University of Prince Edward Island, 1970–72; Carleton University, 1972–95 (retired as full professor), University of Prince Edward Island and Carleton University (-2013), adjunct professor, 1995–1998. He was special advisor to the Fisheries Council of Canada and the Department of Fisheries and Oceans, from 1984 to 1985. He was on the board of governors of the Atlantic Provinces Economic Council from 1997 to 2003 and served as vice-president from 1998 to 2000. He was on the Atlantic Institute of Market Studies, research advisory board since 1998 and served as chairman of the RAB since 2001.

Over his career, Neill wrote three books and over forty academic articles. His writings in the Journal of Canadian Studies were extensive — with subjects including Adam Shortt, Harold Adams Innis, Social Credit, economic activity in Quebec, the state of economic history in the 1970s, and the Saskatchewan school of economic historiography. His work offers a right-wing analysis of Canadian economic history.

He established himself as a critic of Harold Adams Innis’ staple thesis, which explains Canadian economic development as a lateral, east–west conception of trade. Neill advocated a post-Innisian thesis, explaining the development as an expression of variegated regions (population density, cultural politics, geographic characteristics) and of their particular north–south relations with the United States.

== Publications ==
- Neill, Robin (1972). A New Theory of Value: The Canadian Economics of H.A. Innis. Toronto: University of Toronto Press. ISBN 0-8020-1855-6.
- Neill, Robin (1991). A History of Canadian Economic Thought. Routledge History of Economic Thought Series. London: Routledge. ISBN 0-415-05412-5.

=== Book chapters ===
- Neill, Robin (2015), "Canada", in Barnett, V. (ed.), Routledge handbook of the history of global economic thought, New York: Routledge, pp. 130–139

== Selected articles ==
- Neill, Robin (2013), As the twig is bent, globalization & continentalization: Canadian economic development, 1600–2000, Ronkonkoma, N.Y.: Linus Learning
- Neill, Robin (2011), Ontario and Canada in the Great Moderation and beyond, ACEA Papers and Proceedings, Wolfville, Nova Scotia: Atlantic Canada Economics Association (ACEA)
- Neill, Robin (2010), Plus ca change:: the Prairie provinces in the age of globalization, ACEA Papers, Wolfville, Nova Scotia: Atlantic Canada Economics Association (ACEA)
- Neill, Robin F. (May 2009). "Using a wrench as a hammer: Why EI is the wrong tool to respond to loss of income in an economic downturn" (PDF).
