= Staples thesis =

Theory of Canadian economic development

In economic development, the staples thesis is a theory of export-led growth. The theory "has its origins in research into Canadian social, political, and economic history carried out in Canadian universities ... by members of what were then known as departments of political economy." Of these groups of researchers, "the two most prominent scholars following this approach were Harold Innis and W.A. Mackintosh."

== Thesis ==
The thesis explains Canadian economic development in terms of a lateral, east-west organization of trade. Innis argued that Canada developed as it did because of the nature of its staple commodities: raw materials, such as fish, fur, lumber, agricultural products, and minerals, that were exported to Britain and the West Indies. This trading link cemented Canada's cultural links to Britain. The search for and exploitation of these staples led to the creation of institutions that defined the political culture of the nation and its regions.

Innis argues that different staples led to the emergence of distinct regional economies (and societies) within Canada. For instance, the staple commodity in Atlantic Canada was cod. This industry was very decentralized but also very co-operative. In western Canada, the central staple was wheat. Wheat farming was a very independent venture, which led to a history of distrust of government and corporations in that part of the country. (Also important, however, were the shocks caused by volatility in the market for wheat and by the weather itself on the growing season.) In Central Canada, the main staple was fur, and the fur trade dominated the economy for many years. This fur trade was controlled by large firms, such as the Hudson's Bay Company, and thus produced the much more centralized, business-oriented society that today characterizes Montreal and Toronto.

Innis depicted the relationship between regions of Canada as one of "heartland" and "hinterland": The periphery, or hinterland, is dominated by the core, or heartland. Because the heartland was dependent on the search for and accumulation of staples (which were located in the hinterland) to perpetuate the economy, it sought to gain economic and political power by exploiting the hinterland.

To Innis, it was the fur trade that created the geographical boundaries of Canada. The early links between the Canadian interior and eastern ports led to Canadian unity and its distinctiveness from the United States. However, the importance of fur as a staple product also resulted in the northern half of the continent remaining dependent on Britain for trade and thus essentially British for so much of its history.

== Influence and criticism ==
Mel Watkins revived the theory during the 1960s and 1970s through his work on resource capitalism and Canadian political economy. While the staples thesis originally described the evolution of the Canadian state, it has since been used to study the economies of many nations that are dependent upon resource extraction and primary industries.

The staples thesis states that export of raw materials can sustain economic growth, while its critics argue that reliance on commodity export should not delay the development of basic manufacturing and provision of services. Among its strongest critics was Robin Neill, who advocated a thesis explaining the economic development of Canada as an expression of variegated regions (population density, cultural politics, geographic characteristics) and of their particular north-south relationships with the United States.

Historians continue to use elements of Innis's core-periphery model, applying it, for example, to British Columbia. That province's economic structure exemplifies the core-periphery structure of intra-regional relationships in the following manner: the core is metropolitan Vancouver, with its concentration of corporate management and transportation functions and manufacturing growth; Vancouver dominates an underdeveloped periphery that depends on the production and export of staple commodities.

== See also ==
- Metropolitan-hinterland thesis, also developed by Harold Innis
- Historiography of Canada
- Economic history of Canada
- The Fur Trade in Canada by Harold Innis
- Toronto School of communication theory, also pioneered by Harold Innis
