= Elwood S. Moore =

- Born: August 3, 1879; Heathcote, Ontario
- Died: March 26, 1966 (aged 86)
- Education: University of Toronto; University of Chicago
- Scientific career
- Fields: Economic geology
- Workplaces: Pennsylvania State College; University of Toronto

Elwood S. Moore (August 3, 1879 – March 26, 1966) was a Canadian economic geologist, teacher, and administrator.

Born near Heathcote, Ontario, the son of Benjamin and Hannah (Rorke) Moore, Moore graduated from the University of Toronto in 1904 and taught high school until 1907. In that year, he studied at the University of Chicago as a fellow in geology. He received a Master of Arts degree in 1908 from the University of Toronto and his doctorate in 1909 from the University of Chicago.

He was a professor of geology and mineralogy at the School of Mines, Pennsylvania State College, before being appointed dean of the School of Mines in 1919. In 1922 he was made professor of economic geology at the University of Toronto and director of the Royal Ontario Museum of Geology. In 1937, he was appointed head of the department of geology and paleontology. He retired in 1949.

He was a charter fellow of the Mineralogical Society of America. In 1939, he was president of the Society of Economic Geologists. A fellow of the Royal Society of Canada, he was its president from 1945 to 1946, and from 1944 to 1945 he was president of the Royal Canadian Institute.

Moore was an elder member of the Society of Friends (Quaker religion). He supported environmental protection of Toronto's Indian Valley and the Indian Valley Creek.

In 1955, he was awarded an honorary doctor of laws degree by McMaster University.

He was the author of Coal: Its Properties, Analysis, Classification, Geology, Extraction, Uses and Distribution (1922) and Canada's Mineral Resources (Irwin & Gordon, 1929)

Professional and academic associations
Preceded by John K. Robertson	President of the Royal Society of Canada; 1945–1946	Succeeded by Harold Innis
