= Metropolitan-hinterland thesis =

Social and economic development theory

The metropolitan-hinterland thesis (or centre-periphery thesis) theory of social and economic development, developed by the Canadian historian Harold Innis examines how economically advanced societies, through trade and colonialism, distort and impede economic development of less developed societies and regions.

A metropolis is identified as the centre of political and economic power. It possesses a more advanced labor market, more skilled and educated workers, an abundance of value-added production, higher standard of living, etc. A hinterland does not have the resources to withstand the political and economic interference of the metropolis. It features an abundance of resource extraction industries, fewer skilled and educated workers and a lower standard of living, and in many ways, it emulates the culture of the metropolis.

The metropolis-hinterland paradigm has generally been applied to the relationship between Great Britain and its New World colonies. But it has also been applied to the relationship between industrial and rural regions within Canada. Under the theory, the western Canadian provinces (BC, Alberta, Saskatchewan) are a hinterland to the political and economic forces of central Canada (Ontario and Quebec).

== Metropolitan thesis ==
The metropolitan thesis is one of the dominant schools in Canadian historiography. The basic argument of the school states that the driving force in Canadian history has been the nation's metropolitan areas. These originally included the imperial capitals of Paris (before 1763) and London (after 1763); and finally the Canadian centres of Montreal and Toronto in the modern era.

The roots of the metropolitan thesis are found in the writing of Harold Innis, one of Canada's most respected historians. Innis' The Fur Trade in Canada, as well as his work on the Canadian Pacific Railway, put forward the idea that geography, commerce, and resource exploitation were the driving forces of Canadian history. The urban centres of Montreal and Toronto provided the impetus for the growth and formation of the Canadian nation. This is the Staple Thesis.

After Innis, Donald Creighton in his The Empire of the St. Lawrence argued that the massive waterway of the St. Lawrence River and its connections across the continent "became the basis of an extensive communication system around which Canada itself took shape." This is the Laurentian thesis. The common trend in the historical roots of the metropolitan thesis is its opposition to the Frontier Thesis put forward by Frederick Jackson Turner to explain the forces behind American history.

The first articulation of the metropolitan thesis occurred in 1954, with an article in the Canadian Historical Review by historian J. M. S. Careless entitled Frontierism, Metropolitanism, and Canadian History. Careless argues that the developing eastern centres of commerce and industry controlled and oversaw the development of the Canadian nation. The metropolitan school studied "the effects of the East on the West, and largely regarded businessmen and conservative urban political elements as agents of national expansion who might well be more far-sighted in their outlook than were their agrarian opponents."
