= Hla Myint =

Burmese economist (1920–2017)

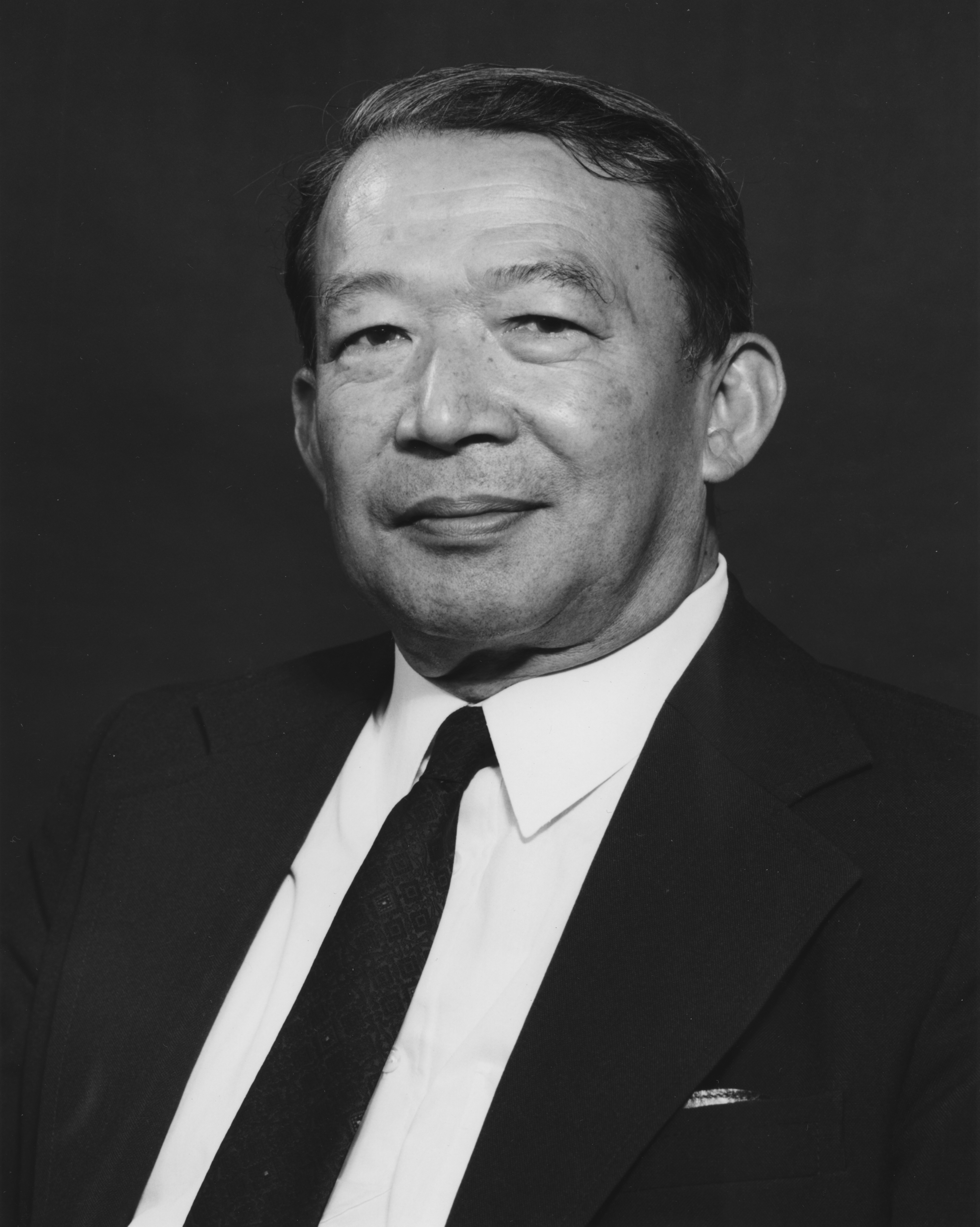
- Hla Myint in 1985
- Born: 1920; Pathein, Irrawaddy Division, British Burma
- Died: 9 March 2017 (aged 96–97); Bangkok, Thailand
- Education: Rangoon University, London School of Economics
- Known for: Development Economics
- Scientific career
- Fields: Economics
- Workplaces: LSE

Hla Myint (Burmese: လှမြင့် [l̥a̰ mjɪ̰ɰ̃]; 1920 – 9 March 2017) was a Burmese economist noted as one of the pioneers of development economics as well as for his contributions to welfare economics. He stressed, long before it became popular, the importance of export-orientation as the most useful "engine of growth".

== Career ==
He enrolled in Rangoon University when he was only 15 years old. After obtaining a Ph.D. in economics at the London School of Economics with a thesis on the Theories of Welfare Economics, he moved to Manchester University with a fellowship arranged by John Hicks in order to convert his thesis into a book. Following this he returned to Burma where he taught as an economics professor at the University of Rangoon, from 1945 to 1952. He also served as the university's rector from 1958 to 1961. He was an economic adviser to the post-independent Burmese government's National Planning Department and the State Agricultural Bank's committee in the 1950s. Hla Myint had a role in the National Planning Committee's formulation of an outward-looking economic growth plan for the country, which was rejected in favor of an insular, inward-looking plan.

In the 1960s Hla Myint introduced the concept of "Vent for surplus" to explain the development of international trade of certain developing countries.

Hla Myint served as Emeritus Professor of Economics, teaching development economics, at the London School of Economics from 1966 to 1985. As an example, in 1972 he authored an important study supported by the Asian Development Bank, Southeast Asia's economy: Development Policy in the 1970s, which emphasised the importance of an export-oriented development strategy for the region. In that study, he argued that the existing import substitution policies commonly followed in Southeast Asia should be replaced by a new industrialization policy based on the expansion of manufactured exports.

He participated in a seminar titled "An Agenda for Equitable and Sustainable Development for Myanmar" in Yangon on 11 February 2012 along with the Nobel prize winner and former World Bank chief economist Professor Joseph Stiglitz, Professor Ronald Findlay, a former professor at the Yangon Institute of Economics and now at Columbia University. Myint died on 9 March 2017 in Bangkok, Thailand at the age of 97.

== Major works ==
- Theories of Welfare Economics, Longmans Green, 1948.
- The Economics of Developing Countries, London: Hutchinson, 1964. Five editions up to 1980.
- "The "Classical Theory" of International Trade and the Underdeveloped Countries." Economic Journal 68.270 (1958): 317–37.
- Economic Theory and the Underdeveloped Countries, Oxford: Oxford University Press,1971.
- Southeast Asia's Economy: Development Policies in the 1970s (Penguin Modern Economics Texts) Penguin Books, 1972.

== Sources ==
- Fuglie, Keith Owen (1991). ""Vent-for-Surplus" as a Source of Agricultural Growth in Northeast Thailand, 1958-1980". The Journal of Developing Areas. 25 (3): 331–346. JSTOR 4191990.
- Hanwong, L. (2019). Hla Myint: bot sathō̜n khwāmkhit thāng sangkhom læ sētthakit khō̜ng Phamā čhāk yuk ʻānānikhom thưng lang ʻānānikhom [Hla Myint: Reflections on Myanmar's Social and Economic Ideas from the Colonial Period to the Post-Colonial Period]. Bangkok: Illuminations Editions. (in Thai) ISBN 9786168215036
