= Harold Innis =

Canadian academic (1894–1952)

Harold Innis FRSC
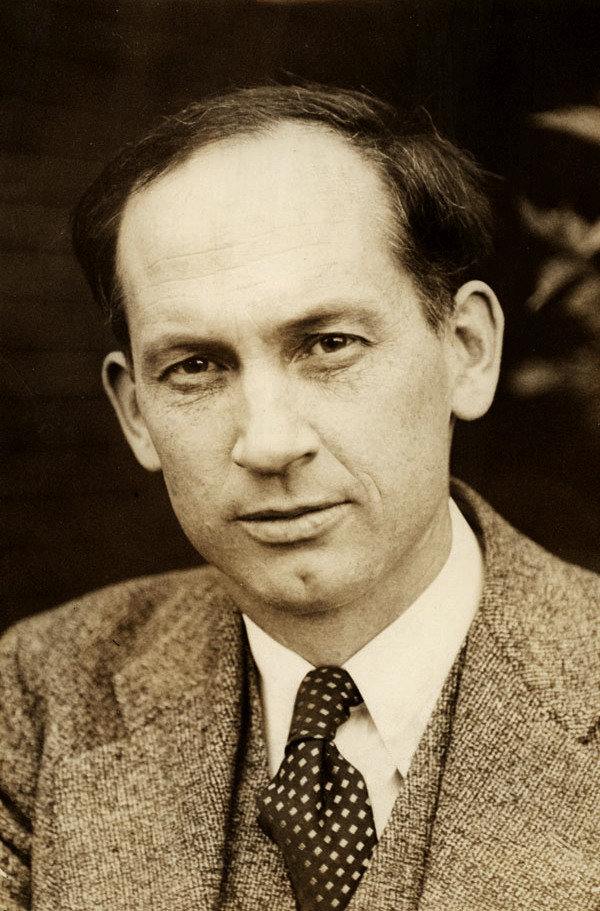
- Innis in the 1920s
- Born: November 5, 1894; Otterville, Ontario, Canada
- Died: November 8, 1952 (aged 58); Toronto, Ontario, Canada
- Spouse: Mary Quayle (m. 1921)
- Children: 5, including Donald and Anne

Academic background
- Education: McMaster University; University of Chicago
- Doctoral advisor: Chester W. Wright

Academic work
- Discipline: Communication studies; political economy
- Sub-discipline: Communication theory; economic history
- School or tradition: Toronto School
- Institutions: University of Toronto
- Doctoral students: S. D. Clark
- Notable students: Albert Faucher
- Notable works: The Fur Trade in Canada (1930); Empire and Communications (1950); The Bias of Communication (1951)
- Notable ideas: Metropolitan-hinterland thesis; staples thesis
- Influenced: Ian Angus; James W. Carey; Donald Creighton; Stuart Henderson; Marshall McLuhan; Arthur R. M. Lower; Marshall Poe; John Ralston Saul; Mel Watkins

Harold Adams Innis (November 5, 1894 – November 8, 1952) was a Canadian professor of political economy at the University of Toronto and the author of seminal works on media, communication theory, and Canadian economic history. He helped develop the staples thesis, which holds that Canada's culture, political history, and economy have been decisively influenced by the exploitation and export of a series of "staples" such as fur, fish, lumber, wheat, mined metals, and coal. The staple thesis dominated economic history in Canada from the 1930s to 1960s, and continues to be a fundamental part of the Canadian political economic tradition. Innis has been referred to as the "father of communications theory" and as the "father of Canadian economic history".

Innis's writings on communication explore the role of media in shaping the culture and development of civilizations. He argued, for example, that a balance between oral and written forms of communication contributed to the flourishing of Greek civilization in the 5th century BC. He warned, however, that Western civilization is now imperiled by powerful, advertising-driven media obsessed by "present-mindedness" and the "continuous, systematic, ruthless destruction of elements of permanence essential to cultural activity." His intellectual bond with Eric A. Havelock formed the foundations of the Toronto School of communication theory, which provided a source of inspiration for future members of the school Marshall McLuhan and Edmund Snow Carpenter.

Innis laid the basis for scholarship that looked at the social sciences from a distinctly Canadian point of view. As the head of the University of Toronto's political economy department, he worked to build up a cadre of Canadian scholars so that universities would not continue to rely as heavily on British or American-trained professors unfamiliar with Canada's history and culture. He was successful in establishing sources of financing for Canadian scholarly research.

As the Cold War grew hotter after 1947, Innis grew increasingly hostile to the United States. He warned repeatedly that Canada was becoming a subservient colony to its much more powerful southern neighbor. "We are indeed fighting for our lives", he warned, pointing especially to the "pernicious influence of American advertising ... We can only survive by taking persistent action at strategic points against American imperialism in all its attractive guises." His views influenced some younger scholars, including Donald Creighton.

Innis also tried to defend universities from political and economic pressures. He believed that independent universities, as centres of critical thought, were essential to the survival of Western civilization. His intellectual disciple and university colleague, Marshall McLuhan, lamented Innis's premature death as a disastrous loss for human understanding. McLuhan wrote: "I am pleased to think of my own book The Gutenberg Galaxy as a footnote to the observations of Innis on the subject of the psychic and social consequences, first of writing then of printing." Mel Watkins declared that Innis was "without doubt the most distinguished social scientist and historian, and one of the most distinguished intellectuals, that Canada has ever produced".

== Rural roots ==
=== Early life ===
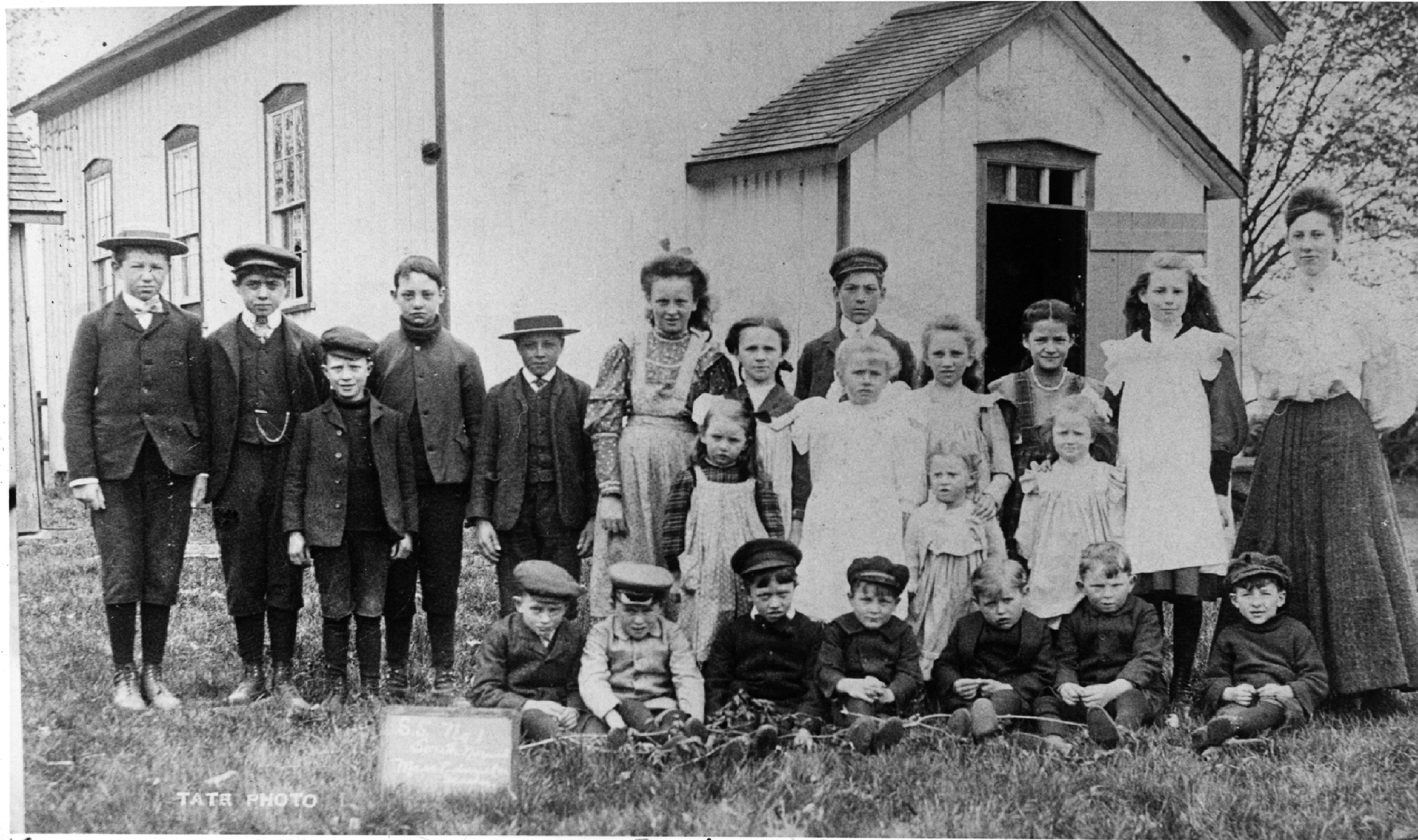
The one-room schoolhouse in Otterville, officially known as S.S.#1 South Norwich. The photo was taken around 1906. Innis is the boy with the cap, fifth from the right, back row. Innis would later teach for a few months at the school.

Innis was born on November 5, 1894, on a small livestock and dairy farm near the community of Otterville in southwestern Ontario's Oxford County. As a boy he loved the rhythms and routines of farm life and he never forgot his rural origins. His mother, Mary Adams Innis, had named him Herald, hoping he would become a minister in the strict evangelical Baptist faith that she and her husband William shared. At the time, the Baptist church was an important part of life in rural areas. It gave isolated families a sense of community and embodied the values of individualism and independence. Its far-flung congregations were not ruled by a centralized, bureaucratic authority. Innis became an agnostic in later life, but never lost his interest in religion. According to his friend and biographer Donald Creighton, Innis's character was moulded by the church:

The strict sense of values and the feeling of devotion to a cause, which became so characteristic of him in later life, were derived, in part at least, from the instruction imparted so zealously and unquestioningly inside the severely unadorned walls of the Baptist Church at Otterville.

Innis attended the one-room schoolhouse in Otterville and the community's high school. He travelled 20 miles (32 km) by train to Woodstock, Ontario, to complete his secondary education at a Baptist-run college. He intended to become a public-school teacher and passed the entrance examinations for teacher training, but decided to take a year off to earn the money he would need to support himself at an Ontario teachers' college. At age 18, therefore, he returned to the one-room schoolhouse at Otterville to teach for one term until the local school board could recruit a fully qualified teacher. The experience made him realize that the life of a teacher in a small, rural school was not for him.

=== University studies ===
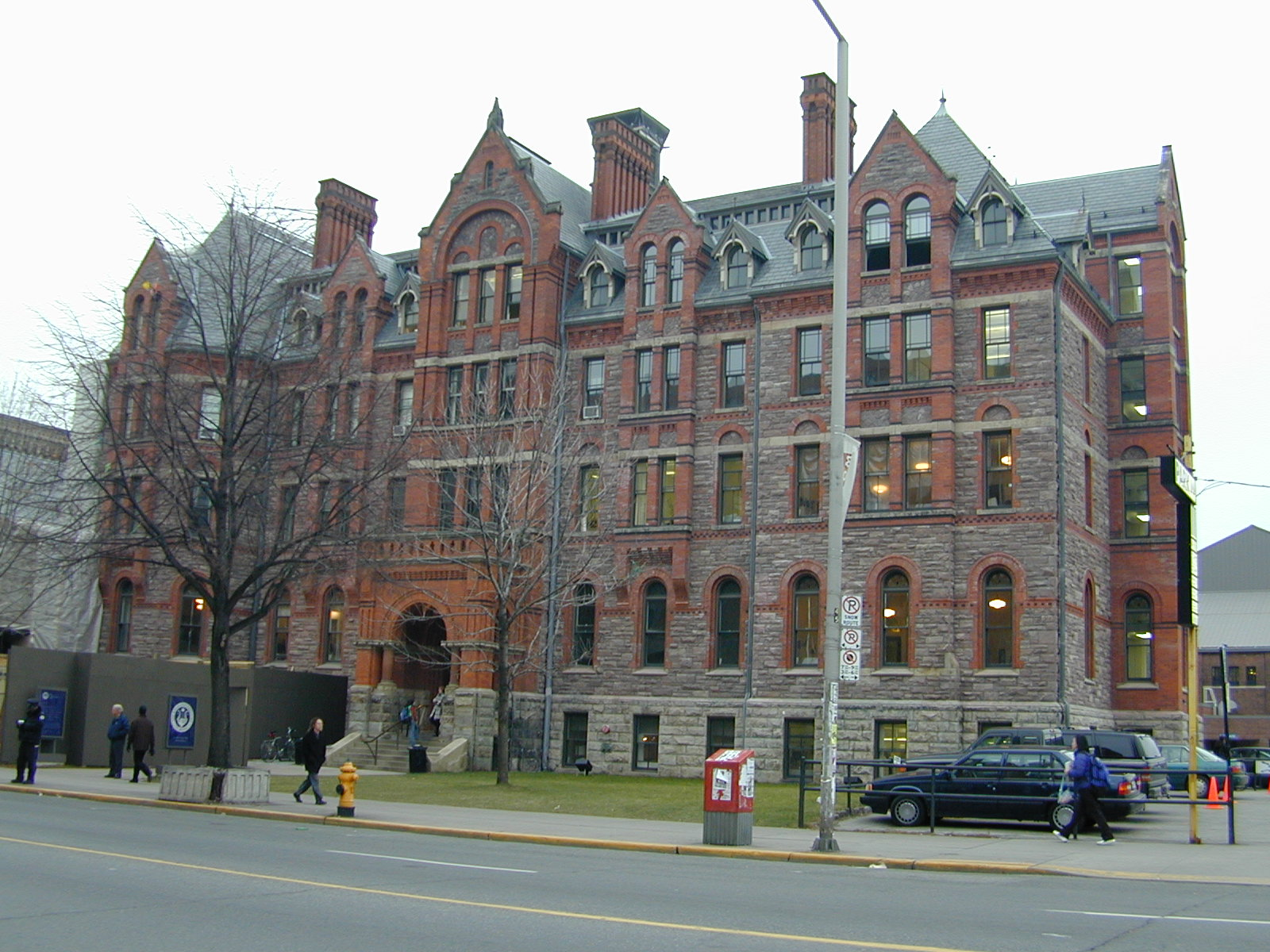
The original home of McMaster University at 273 Bloor Street West, Toronto

In October 1913, Innis started classes at McMaster University (then in Toronto). McMaster was a natural choice for him because it was a Baptist university and many students who attended Woodstock College went there. McMaster's liberal arts professors encouraged critical thinking and debate. Innis was especially influenced by James Ten Broeke, the university's one-man philosophy department. Ten Broeke posed an essay question that Innis pondered for the rest of his life: "Why do we attend to the things to which we attend?"

Before his final undergraduate year at McMaster, Innis spent a summer teaching at the Northern Star School in the frontier farming community of Landonville near Vermilion, Alberta. The experience gave him a sense of the vastness of Canada. He also learned about Western grievances over high interest rates and steep transportation costs. In his final undergraduate year, Innis focused on history and economics. He kept in mind a remark made by history lecturer W. S. Wallace that the economic interpretation of history was not the only possible one but that it went the deepest.

=== First World War service ===
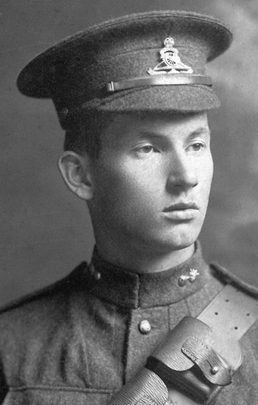
Harold Innis in uniform

After graduating from McMaster, Innis felt that his Christian principles compelled him to enlist in the Canadian Expeditionary Force. He was sent to France in the fall of 1916 to fight in the First World War. Trench warfare with its "mud and lice and rats" had a devastating effect on him.

Innis's role as an artillery signaller gave him firsthand experience of life (and death) on the front lines as he participated in the successful Canadian attack on Vimy Ridge. Signallers, or spotters, watched where each artillery shell landed, then sent back aiming corrections so that the next shells could hit their targets more accurately. On July 7, 1917, Innis received a serious shrapnel wound in his right thigh that required eight months of hospital treatment in England.

Innis's war was over. His biographer, John Watson, notes the physical wound took seven years to heal, but the psychological damage lasted a lifetime. Innis experienced recurring bouts of depression and nervous exhaustion because of his military service.

Watson also notes that the Great War influenced Innis's intellectual outlook. It strengthened his Canadian nationalism; sharpened his opinion of what he thought were the destructive effects of technology, including the communications media that were used so effectively to "sell" the war; and led him, for the first time, to doubt his Baptist faith.

== Graduate studies ==
=== McMaster and Chicago ===
Harold Innis completed a Master of Arts degree at McMaster, graduating in April 1918. His thesis, called The Returned Soldier, "was a detailed description of the public policy measures that were necessary, not only to provide a supportive milieu to help veterans get over the effects of the war, but also to move on with national reconstruction."

Innis did his postgraduate work at the University of Chicago and was awarded his PhD, with a dissertation on the history of Canadian Pacific Railway, in August 1920. His two years at Chicago had a profound influence on his later work. His interest in economics deepened and he decided to become a professional economist. The economics faculty at Chicago questioned abstract and universalist neoclassical theories, then in vogue, arguing that general rules for economic policy should be derived from specific case studies.

Innis was influenced by the university's two eminent communications scholars, George Herbert Mead and Robert E. Park. Although he did not attend any of those famous professors' classes, Innis did absorb their idea that communication involved much more than the transmission of information. James W. Carey writes that Mead and Park "characterized communication as the entire process whereby a culture is brought into existence, maintained in time, and sedimented into institutions."

While at Chicago, Innis was exposed to the ideas of Thorstein Veblen, the iconoclastic thinker who drew on his deep knowledge of philosophy and economics to write scathing critiques of contemporary thought and culture. Veblen had left Chicago years before, but his ideas were still strongly felt there. Years later, in an essay on Veblen, Innis praised him for waging war against "standardized static economics."

Innis got his first taste of university teaching at Chicago, where he delivered several introductory economics courses. One of his students was Mary Quayle, the woman he would marry in May 1921 when he was 26 and she 22. Together they had four children, Donald (1924), Mary (1927), Hugh (1930), and Anne (1933). Mary Quayle Innis was herself a notable economist and writer. Her book, An Economic History of Canada, was published in 1935. Her novel, Stand on a Rainbow appeared in 1943. Her other books include Mrs. Simcoe's Diary (1965), The Clear Spirit: Canadian Women and Their Times (1966) and Unfold the Years (1949), a history of the Young Women's Christian Association. She also edited Harold Innis's posthumous Essays in Canadian Economic History (1956) and a 1972 reissue of his Empire and Communications.

Donald Quayle Innis became a geography professor at the State University of New York. Mary married a surgeon and did graduate work in French literature. Hugh Innis became a professor at Ryerson University where he taught communications and economics. Anne Innis Dagg did doctoral work in biology and became an advisor for the independent studies program at the University of Waterloo and published books on zoology, feminism, and Canadian women's history.

=== History of the CPR ===
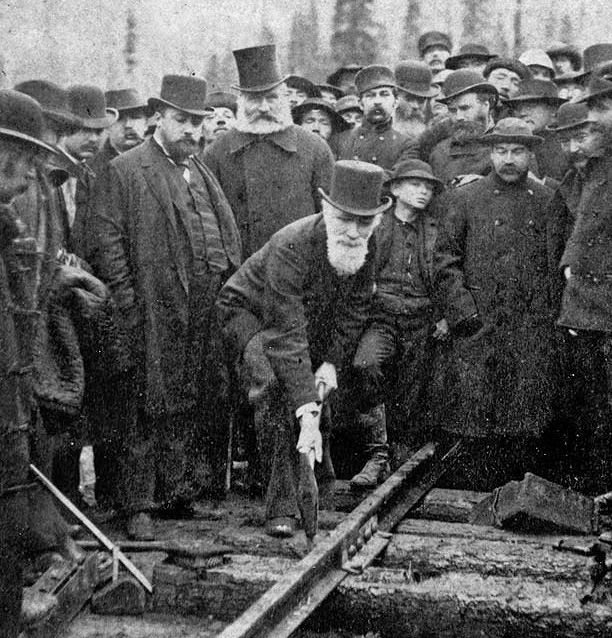
Donald Alexander Smith drives the last spike of the Canadian Pacific Railway at Craigellachie, BC—November 7, 1885

Harold Innis wrote his PhD thesis on the history of the Canadian Pacific Railway (CPR). The completion of Canada's first transcontinental railway in 1885 had been a defining moment in Canadian history. Innis's thesis, eventually published as a book in 1923, can be seen as an early attempt to document the railway's significance from an economic historian's point of view. It uses voluminous statistics to underpin its arguments. Innis maintains that the difficult and expensive construction project was sustained by fears of American annexation of the Canadian West.

Innis argues that "the history of the Canadian Pacific Railroad is primarily the history of the spread of Western civilization over the northern half of the North American continent." As Robert Babe notes, the railway brought industrialization, transporting coal and building supplies to manufacturing sites. It was also a kind of communications medium that contributed to the spread of European civilization. Babe writes that, for Innis, the CPR's equipment "comprised a massive, energy-consuming, fast-moving, powerful, capital-intensive 'sign' dropped into the very midst of indigenous peoples, whose entire way of life was disrupted, and eventually shattered as a result.

Communications scholar Arthur Kroker argues that Innis's study of the Canadian Pacific Railway was only the first in which he attempted to demonstrate that "technology is not something external to Canadian being; but on the contrary, is the necessary condition and lasting consequence of Canadian existence." It also reflected Innis's lifelong interest in the exercise of economic and political power. His CPR history ends, for example, with a recounting of Western grievances against economic policies, such as high freight rates and the steep import tariffs designed to protect fledgling Canadian manufacturers. Westerners complained that the National Policy funnelled money from Prairie farmers into the pockets of the Eastern business establishment. "Western Canada," Innis wrote, "has paid for the development of Canadian nationality, and it would appear that it must continue to pay. The acquisitiveness of Eastern Canada shows little sign of abatement."

== Staples thesis ==
Harold Innis is considered the leading founder of a Canadian school of economic thought known as the staples theory. It holds that Canada's culture, political history and economy have been decisively shaped by the exploitation and export of a series of "staples" such as fur, fish, wood, wheat, mined metals and fossil fuels. Innis theorized that the reliance on exporting natural resources made Canada dependent on more industrially advanced countries and resulted in periodic disruptions to economic life as the international demand for staples rose and fell; as the staple itself became increasingly scarce; and, as technological change resulted in shifts from one staple to others. Innis pointed out, for example, that as furs became scarce and trade in that staple declined, it became necessary to develop and export other staples such as wheat, potash and especially lumber. The export of the new staples was made possible through improved transportation networks that included first canals and later railways.

=== "Dirt" research ===
In 1920, Innis joined the department of political economy at the University of Toronto. He was assigned to teach courses in commerce, economic history and economic theory. He decided to focus his scholarly research on Canadian economic history, a hugely neglected subject, and he settled on the fur trade as his first area of study. Furs had brought French and English traders to Canada, motivating them to travel west along the continent's interlocking lake and river systems to the Pacific coast. Innis realized that he had to search out archival documents to understand the history of the fur trade and also travel the country himself gathering masses of firsthand information and accumulating what he called "dirt" experience.

Thus, Innis travelled extensively beginning in the summer of 1924 when he and a friend paddled an 18-foot (5.5 m) canvas-covered canoe hundreds of miles down the Peace River to Lake Athabasca; then down the Slave River to Great Slave Lake. They completed their journey down the Mackenzie, Canada's longest river, to the Arctic Ocean on a small Hudson's Bay Company tug. During his travels, Innis supplemented his fur research by gathering information on other staple products such as lumber, pulp and paper, minerals, grain and fish. He travelled so extensively that by the early 1940s, he had visited every part of Canada except for the Western Arctic and the east side of Hudson Bay.

Everywhere that Innis went, his methods were the same: he interviewed people connected with the production of staple products and listened to their stories.

=== Fur trade in Canada ===
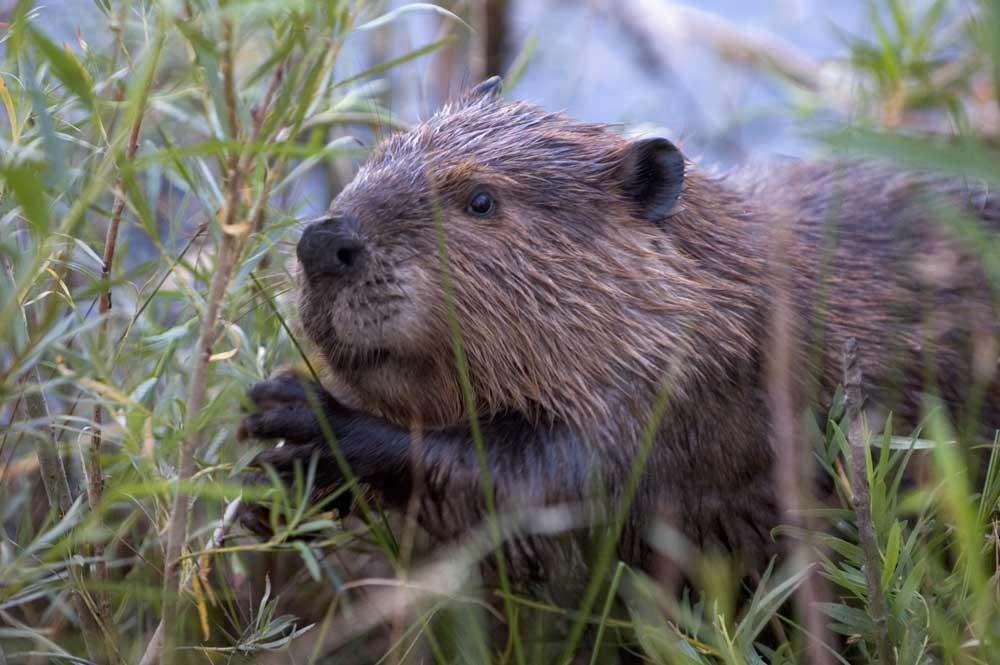
North American beaver, castor canadensis. Innis argued that it is impossible to understand Canadian history without some knowledge of the beaver's life and habits.

Harold Innis's interest in the relationship between empires and colonies was developed in his classic study, The Fur Trade in Canada: An Introduction to Canadian Economic History (1930). The book chronicles the trade in beaver fur from the early 16th century to the 1920s. Instead of focusing on the "heroic" European adventurers who explored the Canadian wilderness as conventional histories had done, Innis documents how the interplay of geography, technology and economic forces shaped both the fur trade and Canada's political and economic destiny. He argues that the fur trade largely determined Canada's boundaries, and he comes to the conclusion that the country "emerged not in spite of geography but because of it."

In line with that observation, Innis notably proposes that European settlement of the Saint Lawrence River Valley followed the economic and social patterns of indigenous peoples, making for a Canadian historical and cultural continuity that predates and postdates European settlement. Unlike many historians who see Canadian history as beginning with the arrival of Europeans, Innis emphasizes the cultural and economic contributions of First Nations peoples. "We have not yet realized," he writes, "that the Indian and his culture was fundamental to the growth of Canadian institutions."

The Innisian perspective on the development of Canadian political, economic and social institutions was an early form of neo-institutionalism, which became an accepted part of the Canadian political science tradition well before American and European counterparts. The Fur Trade in Canada concludes by arguing that Canadian economic history can best be understood by examining how one staple product gave way to another—furs to timber, for example, and the later importance of wheat and minerals. Reliance on staples made Canada economically dependent on more industrially advanced countries and the "cyclonic" shifts from one staple to another caused frequent disruptions in the country's economic life.

The Fur Trade in Canada also describes the cultural interactions among three groups of people: the Europeans in fashionable metropolitan centres who regarded beaver hats as luxury items; the European colonial settlers who saw beaver fur as a staple that could be exported to pay for essential manufactured goods from the home country, and First Nations peoples who traded furs for industrial goods such as metal pots, knives, guns and liquor. Innis describes the central role First Nations peoples played in the development of the fur trade. Without their skilled hunting techniques, knowledge of the territory and advanced tools such as snowshoes, toboggans and birch-bark canoes, the fur trade would not have existed. However, dependence on European technologies disrupted First Nations societies. "The new technology with its radical innovations," Innis writes, "brought about such a rapid shift in the prevailing Indian culture as to lead to wholesale destruction of the peoples concerned by warfare and disease." Historian Carl Berger argues that by placing First Nations culture at the centre of his analysis of the fur trade, Innis "was the first to explain adequately the disintegration of native society under the thrust of European capitalism."

=== Cod fishery ===
After the publication of his book on the fur trade, Innis turned to a study of an earlier staple, the cod fished for centuries off the eastern coasts of North America. The result was The Cod Fisheries: The History of an International Economy published in 1940, 10 years after the fur trade study. Innis tells the detailed history of competing empires in the exploitation of a teeming natural resource, a history that ranges over 500 years. While his study of the fur trade focused on the continental interior with its interlocking rivers and lakes, The Cod Fisheries looks outward at global trade and empire, showing the far-reaching effects of one staple product both on imperial centres and on marginal colonies such as Newfoundland, Nova Scotia, and New England.

== Communications theories ==
Innis's study of the effects of interconnected lakes and rivers on Canadian development and European empire sparked his interest in the complex economic and cultural relationships between transportation systems and communications. During the 1940s, Innis also began studying pulp and paper, an industry of central importance to the Canadian economy. The research provided an additional crossover point from his work on staple products to his communications studies. Biographer Paul Heyer writes that Innis "followed pulp and paper through its subsequent stages: newspapers and journalism, books and advertising. In other words, from looking at a natural resource-based industry he turned his attention to a cultural industry in which information, and ultimately knowledge, was a commodity that circulated, had value, and empowered those who controlled it."

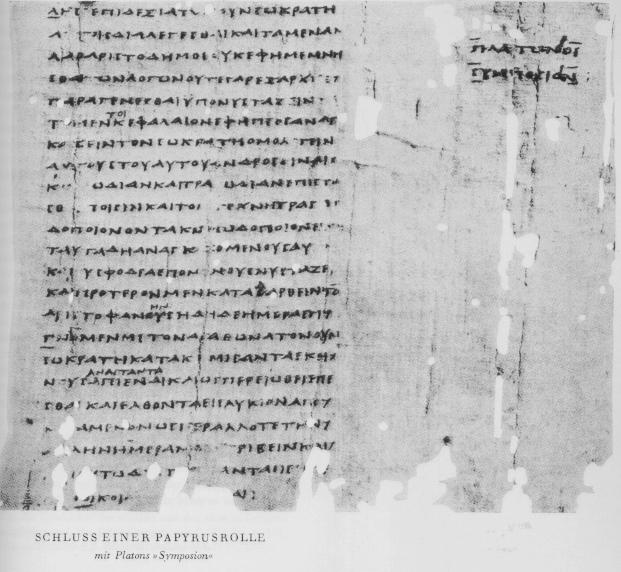
A Greek copy of Plato's Symposium from a papyrus roll. Innis argued that Plato's dialogues combined the vitality of the spoken word with the power of writing, a perfect balance between time and space.

One of Innis's primary contributions to communications studies was to apply the dimensions of time and space to various media. He divided media into time-binding and space-binding types. Time-binding media are durable and include clay or stone tablets. Space-binding media are more ephemeral and include modern media such as radio, television, and mass circulation newspapers.

Innis examined the rise and fall of ancient empires as a way of tracing the effects of communications media. He looked at media that led to the growth of an empire; those that sustained it during its periods of success, and then, the communications changes that hastened an empire's collapse. He tried to show that media 'biases' toward time or space affected the complex interrelationships needed to sustain an empire. The interrelationships included the partnership between the knowledge (and ideas) necessary to create and maintain an empire and the power (or force) required to expand and defend it. For Innis, the interplay between knowledge and power was always a crucial factor in understanding empire.

Innis argued that a balance between the spoken word and writing contributed to the flourishing of Ancient Greece in the time of Plato. The balance between the time-biased medium of speech and the space-biased medium of writing was eventually upset, Innis argued, as the oral tradition gave way to the dominance of writing. The torch of empire then passed from Greece to Rome.

Innis's analysis of the effects of communications on the rise and fall of empires led him to warn grimly that Western civilization was now facing its own profound crisis. The development of powerful communications media such as mass-circulation newspapers had shifted the balance decisively in favour of space and power, over time, continuity and knowledge. The balance required for cultural survival had been upset by what Innis saw as "mechanized" communications media used to transmit information quickly over long distances. The new media had contributed to an obsession with "present-mindedness", wiping out concerns about past or future. Innis wrote,

The overwhelming pressure of mechanization evident in the newspaper and the magazine, has led to the creation of vast monopolies of communication. Their entrenched positions involve a continuous, systematic, ruthless destruction of elements of permanence essential to cultural activity.

Western civilization could be saved, Innis argued, only by recovering the balance between space and time. For him, that meant reinvigorating the oral tradition within universities while freeing institutions of higher learning from political and commercial pressures. In his essay, A Plea for Time, he suggested that genuine dialogue within universities could produce the critical thinking necessary to restore the balance between power and knowledge. Then, universities could muster the courage to attack the monopolies that always imperil civilization.

Although Innis remains appreciated and respected for the grand and unique nature of his later efforts regarding communications theories, he was not without critics. Particularly, the fragmentary and mosaic writing style exemplified in Empire and Communications has been criticized as ambiguous, aggressively nonlinear, and lacking connections between levels of analysis. Biographers have suggested that the style may have been a result of Innis's illness late in his career.

== Academic and public career ==
=== Influence in the 1930s ===
Aside from his work on The Cod Fisheries, Innis wrote extensively in the 1930s about other staple products such as minerals and wheat as well as Canada's immense economic problems in the Great Depression. During the summers of 1932 and 1933, he travelled to the West to see the effects of the Depression for himself. The next year, in an essay entitled, The Canadian Economy and the Depression, Innis outlined the plight of "a country susceptible to the slightest ground-swell of international disturbance" but beset by regional differences that made it difficult to devise effective solutions. He described a prairie economy dependent on the export of wheat but afflicted by severe drought, on the one hand, and the increased political power of Canada's growing cities, sheltered from direct reliance on the staples trade, on the other. The result was political conflict and a breakdown in federal–provincial relations. "We lack vital information on which to base prospective policies to meet this situation," Innis warned, because of "the weak position of the social sciences in Canada."

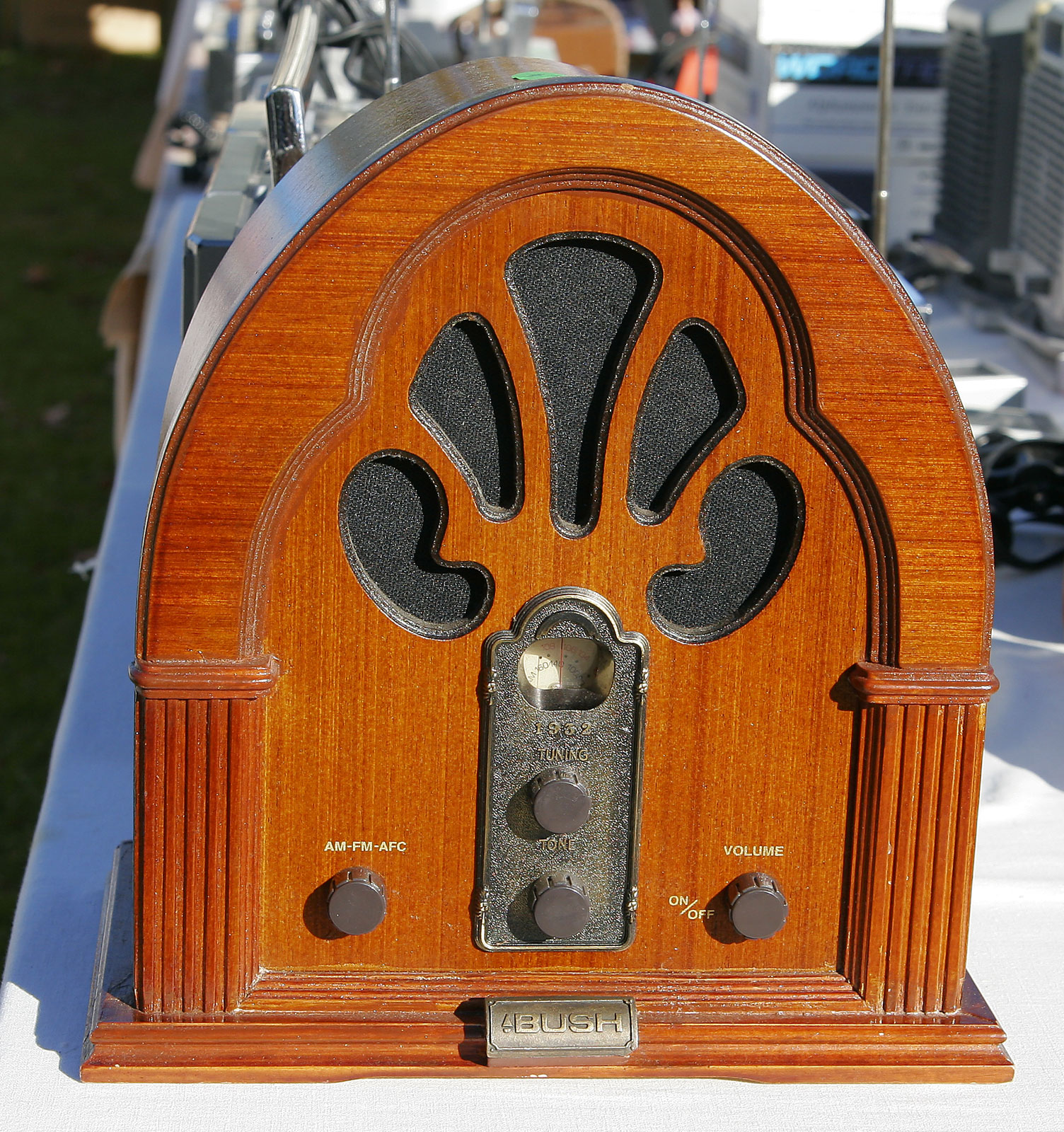
Radio, a new medium, drew a scathing rebuke from Harold Innis for promoting "small talk" and "bores." Innis believed that both radio and mass circulation newspapers encouraged stereotypical thinking.

Innis's reputation as a public intellectual was growing steadily and, in 1934, Premier Angus Lewis Macdonald invited him to serve on a Royal Commission to examine Nova Scotia's economic problems. The next year, he helped establish The Canadian Journal of Economics and Political Science. In 1936, he was appointed a full University of Toronto professor and a year later, became the head of the university's Department of Political Economy.

Innis was appointed president of the Canadian Political Science Association in 1938. His inaugural address, The Penetrative Powers of the Price System, must have baffled his listeners as he ranged over centuries of economic history jumping abruptly from one topic to the next linking monetary developments to patterns of trade and settlement. The address was an ambitious attempt to show the disruptive effects of new technologies culminating in the modern shift from an industrial system based on coal and iron to the newest sources of industrial power, electricity, oil, and steel. Innis also tried to show the commercial effects of mass circulation newspapers, made possible by expanded newsprint production, and of the new medium of radio, which "threatens to circumvent the walls imposed by tariffs and to reach across boundaries frequently denied to other media of communication." Both media, Innis argued, stimulated the demand for consumer goods and both promoted nationalism.

Innis was also a central participant in an international project that produced 25 scholarly volumes between 1936 and 1945. It was a series called The Relations of Canada and the United States overseen by James T. Shotwell, director of the Carnegie Endowment for International Peace. Innis edited and wrote prefaces for the volumes contributed by Canadian scholars. His own study of the cod fisheries also appeared as part of the series. His work with Shotwell enabled Innis to gain access to Carnegie money to further Canadian academic research. As John Watson points out, "the project offered one of the few sources of research funds in rather lean times."

=== Politics and the Great Depression ===
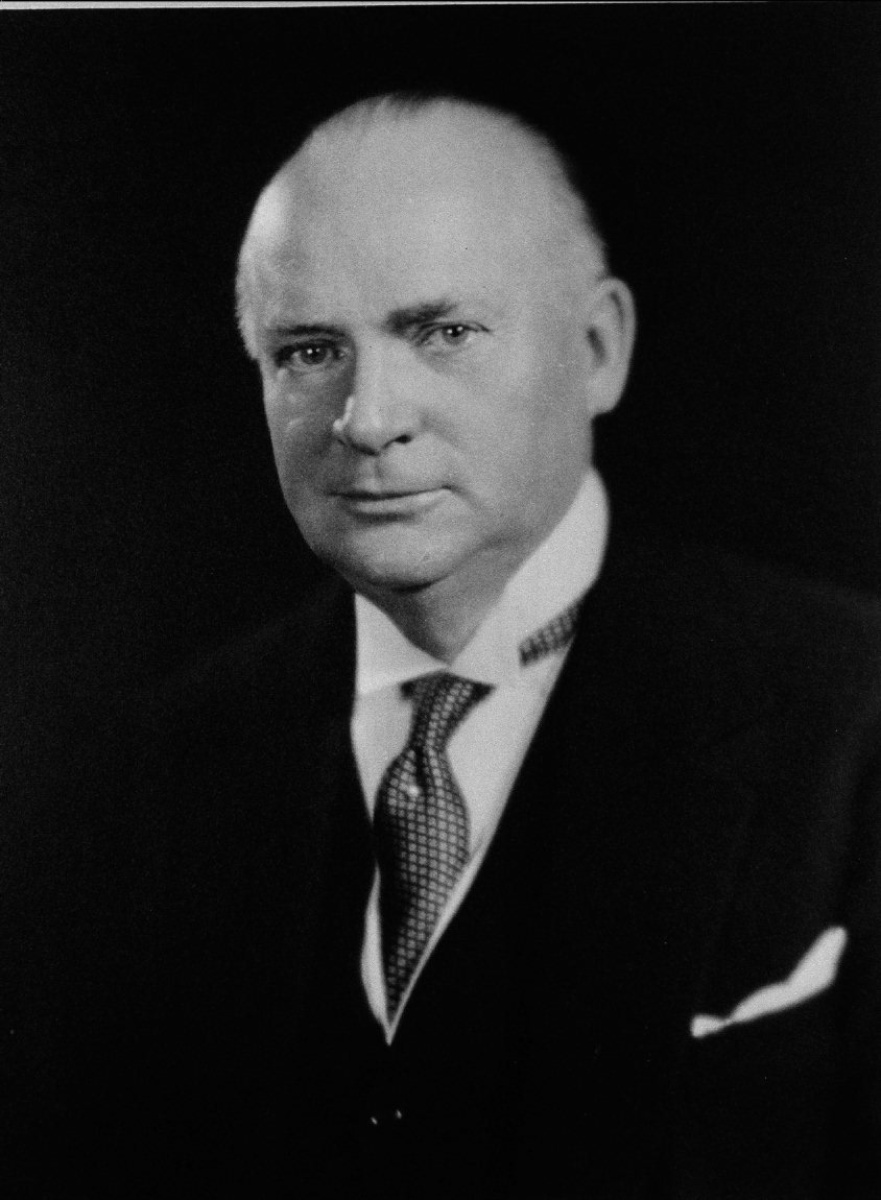
R. B. Bennett was the Conservative Prime Minister of Canada from 1930 to 1935, during the depths of the Great Depression. Although Innis advocated staying out of politics, he did correspond with Bennett urging him to strengthen the law against business monopolies.

The era of the "Dirty Thirties" with its mass unemployment, poverty and despair gave rise to new Canadian political movements. In Alberta, for example, the radio evangelist William "Bible Bill" Aberhart led his populist Social Credit party to victory in 1935. Three years earlier in Calgary, Alberta, social reformers had founded a new political party, the Co-operative Commonwealth Federation (CCF). It advocated democratic socialism and a mixed economy with public ownership of key industries. Frank Underhill, one of Innis's colleagues at the University of Toronto was a founding member of the CCF. Innis and Underhill had both been members of an earlier group at the university that declared itself "dissatisfied with the policies of the two major [political] parties in Canada" and that aimed at "forming a definite body of progressive opinion." In 1931, Innis presented a paper to the group on "Economic Conditions in Canada", but he later recoiled from participating in party politics, denouncing partisans like Underhill as "hot gospellers."

Innis maintained that scholars had no place in active politics and that they should instead devote themselves, first to research on public problems, and then to the production of knowledge based on critical thought. He saw the university, with its emphasis on dialogue, open-mindedness and skepticism, as an institution that could foster such thinking and research. "The university could provide an environment," he wrote, "as free as possible from the biases of the various institutions that form the state, so that its intellectuals could continue to seek out and explore other perspectives."

Although sympathetic to the plight of western farmers and urban, unemployed workers, Innis did not embrace socialism. Eric Havelock, a left-leaning colleague explained many years later that Innis distrusted political "solutions" imported from elsewhere, especially those based on Marxist analysis with its emphasis on class conflict. He worried, too, that as Canada's ties with Britain weakened, the country would fall under the spell of American ideas instead of developing its own based on Canada's unique circumstances. Havelock added:

He has been called the radical conservative of his day—not a bad designation of a complex mind, clear sighted, cautious, perhaps at bottom pessimistic in areas where thinkers we would label 'progressive' felt less difficulty in taking a stand; never content to select only one or two elements in a complicated equation in order to build a quick-order policy or program; far ranging enough in intellect to take in the whole sum of the factors, and comprehend their often contradictory effects.

=== Late career and death ===
In the 1940s, Harold Innis reached the height of his influence in both academic circles and Canadian society. In 1941, he helped establish the American-based Economic History Association and its Journal of Economic History. He later became the association's second president. Innis played a central role in founding two important sources for the funding of academic research: the Canadian Social Science Research Council (1940) and the Humanities Research Council of Canada (1944).

In 1944, the University of New Brunswick awarded Innis an honorary degree, as did his alma mater, McMaster University. Université Laval, the University of Manitoba and the University of Glasgow would also confer honorary degrees in 1947–48. He received the Royal Society of Canada's J. B. Tyrrell Historical Medal in 1944.

In 1945, Innis spent nearly a month in the Soviet Union where he had been invited to attend the 220th anniversary celebrations marking the founding of the country's Academy of Sciences. Later, in his essay Reflections on Russia, he mused about the differences between the Soviet "producer" economy and the West's "consumer" ethos:

[A]n economy which emphasizes consumer's goods is characterized by communication industries largely dependent on advertising and by constant efforts to reach the largest number of readers or listeners; an economy emphasizing producer's goods is characterized by communications industries largely dependent on government support. As a result of this contrast, a common public opinion in Russia and the West is hard to achieve.

Innis's trip to Moscow and Leningrad came shortly before US–Soviet rivalry led to the hostility of the Cold War. Innis lamented the rise in international tensions. He saw the Soviet Union as a stabilizing counterbalance to the American emphasis on commercialism, the individual and constant change. For Innis, Russia was a society within the Western tradition, not an alien civilization. He abhorred the nuclear arms race and saw it as the triumph of force over knowledge, a modern form of the medieval Inquisition. "The Middle Ages burned its heretics," he wrote, "and the modern age threatens them with atom bombs."

In 1946, Innis was elected president of the Royal Society of Canada, the country's senior body of scientists and scholars. The same year, he served on the Manitoba Royal Commission on Adult Education and published Political Economy in the Modern State, a collection of his speeches and essays that reflected both his staples research and his new work in communications. In 1947, Innis was appointed the University of Toronto's dean of graduate studies. In 1948, he delivered lectures at the University of London and Nottingham University. He was elected an International Member of the American Philosophical Society that same year. He also gave the prestigious Beit lectures at Oxford, later published in his book Empire and Communications. In 1949, Innis was appointed as a commissioner on the federal government's Royal Commission on Transportation, a position that involved extensive travel at a time when his health was starting to fail. The last decade of his career, during which he worked on his communications studies, was an unhappy time for Innis. He was academically isolated because his colleagues in economics could not fathom how the new work related to his pioneering research in staples theory. Biographer John Watson writes that "the almost complete lack of positive response to the communications works, contributed to his sense of overwork and depression."

Innis died of prostate cancer on November 8, 1952, a few days after his 58th birthday. In commemoration, Innis College at the University of Toronto and Innis Library at McMaster University were named in his honour.

Following his premature death, Innis's significance increasingly deepened as scholars in several academic disciplines continued to build upon his writings. Marshall Poe's general media theory that proposes two sub-theories were inspired by Innis. Douglas C. North expanded on Innis's "vent for surplus" theory of economic development by applying it to regional development in the United States and underdeveloped countries. In addition, James W. Carey adopted Innis as a "reference point in his conception of two models of communication."

== Innis and McLuhan ==
Marshall McLuhan was a colleague of Innis's at the University of Toronto. As a young English professor, McLuhan was flattered when he learned that Innis had put his book The Mechanical Bride on the reading list of the fourth-year economics course. McLuhan built on Innis's idea that in studying the effects of communications media, technological form mattered more than content. Biographer Paul Heyer writes that Innis's concept of the "bias" of a particular medium of communication can be seen as a "less flamboyant precursor to McLuhan's legendary phrase 'the medium is the message.'" Innis, for example, tried to show how printed media such as books or newspapers were "biased" toward control over space and secular power, while engraved media such as stone or clay tablets were "biased" in favour of continuity in time and metaphysical or religious knowledge. McLuhan focused on what may be called a medium's "sensory bias" arguing, for example, that books and newspapers appealed to the rationality of the eye, while radio played to the irrationality of the ear. The differences in the Innisian and McLuhanesque approaches were summarized by the late James W. Carey:

Both McLuhan and Innis assume the centrality of communication technology; where they differ is in the principal kinds of effects they see deriving from this technology. Whereas Innis sees communication technology principally affecting social organization and culture, McLuhan sees its principal effect on sensory organization and thought. McLuhan has much to say about perception and thought but little to say about institutions; Innis says much about institutions and little about perception and thought.

Biographer John Watson notes that Innis's work was profoundly political while McLuhan's was not. He writes that "the mechanization of knowledge, not the relative sensual bias of media, is the key to Innis's work. That also underlies the politicization of Innis's position vis-a-vis that of McLuhan." Watson adds that Innis believed very different media could produce similar effects. "For Innis, the yellow press of the United States and the Nazi loudspeaker had the same form of negative effect: they reduced men from thinking beings to mere automatons in a chain of command." Watson argues that while McLuhan separated media according to their sensory bias, Innis examined a different set of interrelationships, the "dialectic of power and knowledge" in specific historical circumstances. For Watson, Innis's work is therefore more flexible and less deterministic than McLuhan's.

As scholars and teachers, Innis and McLuhan shared a similar dilemma since both argued that book culture tended to produce fixed points of view and homogeneity of thought; yet both produced many books. In his introduction to the 1964 reprint of The Bias of Communication, McLuhan marvelled at Innis's technique of juxtaposing "his insights in a mosaic structure of seemingly unrelated and disproportioned sentences and aphorisms." McLuhan argued that although that made reading Innis's dense prose difficult ("a pattern of insights that are not packaged for the consumer palate"), Innis's method approximated "the natural form of conversation or dialogue rather than of written discourse." Best of all, it yielded "insight" and "pattern recognition" rather than the "classified knowledge" so overvalued by print-trained scholars. "How exciting it was to encounter a writer whose every phrase invited prolonged meditation and exploration," McLuhan added. McLuhan's own books with their reliance on aphorisms, puns, quips, "probes" and oddly juxtaposed observations also employ that mosaic technique.

Innis's theories of political economy, media and society remain highly relevant: he had a profound influence on critical media theory and communications and, in conjunction with McLuhan, offered groundbreaking Canadian perspectives on the function of communication technologies as key agents in social and historical change. Together, their works advanced a theory of history in which communication is central to social change and transformation.

== Selected works ==
- 1923. A History of the Canadian Pacific Railway. Revised edition (1971). Toronto: University of Toronto Press.
- 1930. The Fur Trade in Canada: An Introduction to Canadian Economic History. Revised edition (1956). Toronto: University of Toronto Press.
- 1930. Peter Pond, Fur Trader and Adventurer. Toronto: Irwin & Gordon.
- 1940. The Cod Fisheries: The History of an International Economy. Toronto: The Ryerson Press
- 1946. Political Economy in the Modern State. Toronto: The Ryerson Press
- 1948. The Diary of Simeon Perkins: 1766–1780. Toronto: Champlain Society. [editor]
- 1950. Empire and Communications. Oxford: Clarendon Press.
- 1951. The Bias of Communication. Toronto: University of Toronto Press.
- 1952. The Strategy of Culture. Toronto: University of Toronto Press.
- 1952. Changing Concepts of Time. Toronto: University of Toronto Press.
- 1956. Essays in Canadian Economic History, edited by Mary Q. Innis. Toronto: University of Toronto Press.
- 1980. The Idea File of Harold Adams Innis, edited by William Christian. Toronto: University of Toronto Press.

== See also ==
- Historiography of Canada
- History of communication
- History of technology
- Innis-Gérin Medal
- Metropolitan-hinterland thesis
- Monopolies of knowledge
- Orality
- Technological nationalism

== Notes ==
Professional and academic associations
Preceded by William Archibald Mackintosh	President of the Canadian Political Science Association; 1937–1938	Succeeded by John Wesley Dafoe
Preceded by Elwood S. Moore	President of the Royal Society of Canada; 1946–1947	Succeeded by Walter P. Thompson
Preceded by John Henry Williams	President of the American Economic Association; 1952	Succeeded by Calvin B. Hoover
