= Vent for surplus =

Vent for surplus is a theory that was formulated by Adam Smith and later revised by Hla Myint on his thesis of South East Asia. The theory states that when a country produces more than it can consume, it produces a surplus. This underutilization causes an inward movement on the production possibilities frontier. Trade with another country is then used to vent off this surplus and to bring the production possibilities in the frontier back to full capacity.

Concerning the classical formulation of the theory (by Adam Smith), John Stuart Mill, in his ‘’Principles of Political Economy’’ says, that the “vent for surplus” approach is “in truth a surviving relic of the Mercantile Theory, according to which, money being the only wealth, selling, or in other words, exchanging goods for money, was (to countries without mines of their own) the only way of growing rich — and importation of goods, that is to say, parting with money, was so much subtracted from the benefit.”

== Sources ==
- Mill, John Stuart (1871). Principles of Political Economy (7th ed.) – via Wikisource.
