= Historiography of Canada =

Historiography of a country

The historiography of Canada deals with the manner in which historians have depicted, analyzed, and debated the history of Canada. It also covers the popular memory of critical historical events, ideas and leaders, as well as the depiction of those events in museums, monuments, reenactments, pageants and historic sites.

Amateur historians dominated publications in the 19th century, and are still very widely read, and pull many tourists to museums and historic sites. They favored such themes as the colonial history, exploration, and the great contest for control between the British and the French. Professional historians emerged from the academic institutions, and typically were trained in British universities. Major themes in recent generations continue to be exploration and settlement, the British conquest of 1760, the independent emergence of a Quebec culture separate from both France and Britain, involvement in wars with the United States (in 1776 and 1812), and Canadian roles in the two world wars (WWI and WWII) of the 20th century. In political history, Confederation remains a major theme, as do the political conflicts between ethnic, racial and religious coalitions. Nationalism has replaced the earlier emphasis on the very close links to British culture. Diplomatic history starts in the early 20th century, and for the post 1945 era emphasizes Canada's role as a middle power in world affairs. Economic historians emphasize the role of the St. Lawrence transportation system, and the export of staple commodities. Social historians have taken new perspectives on Indigenous peoples, women and gender, and multiculturalism. Cultural historians have paid special attention to the dominance of American influences, and efforts to sustain an independent Canadian perspective. Most recently environmentalism has become a topic both for specialist, and for generalists who use the Canadian experience as a model.

== Amateur historians ==
Amateur historians, self-taught in the knowledge of the sources but with limited attention to historiography, dominated publications until the early 20th century.

The most influential of the amateur historians was François-Xavier Garneau (1809–1866), a self-educated poor boy who defined the essence of Quebec nationalistic history for a century with his Histoire du Canada depuis sa découverte jusqu' à nos jours (3 vol., multiple editions from 1845 onward). The first edition came under attack from Catholic Church officials for its touch of liberalism; after he revised the work the Church gave its blessing. He taught the profound linkage of language, laws, and customs, and how the Catholic faith was essential to the French Canadian nationality. His ideas became dogma across Québec, and were continued deep into the 20th century by Abbe Lionel Groulx (1878–1967), the first full-time university professor of Québec history.

In Anglophone Canada the most prominent amateur of his day was William Kingsford (1819–1898), whose History of Canada (1887–1898) was widely read by the upper middle class, as well as Anglophone teachers, despite its poor organization and pedestrian writing style. Kingsford believed that the Conquest guaranteed victory for British constitutional liberty and that it ensured material progress. He assumed the assimilation of French Canadians into a superior British culture was inevitable and desirable, for he envisioned Canada as one nation with one anglophone population.

Lovers of the past set up local historical societies and museums preserve the documents and artifacts. Amateurs are still quite important, especially as journalists write biographies of politicians and studies of major political developments.

By far the most popular of the amateurs was the Harvard-based American Francis Parkman (1823–1893), whose nine volumes on France and England in North America (Boston, 1865–92) are still widely read as literary masterpieces.

== Organizations of professional historians ==
Professionalism emerged after 1890 with the founding of academic history departments at universities, and the practice of sending graduate students to Britain for advanced training in preparation for a university professorship. In 1896, George McKinnon Wrong, an Anglican clergyman, introduced modern Canadian history to the University of Toronto. He launched the Review of Historical Publications Relating to Canada, which was the forerunner of the Canadian Historical Review. Professionalization climaxed with the 1922 founding of the Canadian Historical Association (CHA). The language became technical, and scientific, with an emphasis on gathering facts from primary sources, and avoiding grandiose patriotic claims. Women, who had been quite active in historical societies and museums, were largely excluded from professional history.

The CHA has a journal and an annual convention, and gives out numerous awards For the best publications. Much of the work is done by specialized committees. For example, the Canadian Committee on Labour History, publishes its own journal Labour/Le Travail and holds an annual conference as part of the Congress of the Canadian Federation for the Humanities and Social Sciences (the "Learneds").

Other topical interest committees include:

- ActiveHistory
- Canadian Business History Association
- Canadian Committee for Digital History
- Canadian Committee on the History of Sexuality
- Canadian Committee on Labour History
- Canadian Committee on Migration, Ethnicity and Transnationalism
- Canadian Committee on Military History
- Canadian Committee on Women's History
- Canadian International History Committee
- Canadian Network for Economic History
- Canadian Network on Humanitarian History
- Canadian Urban History Caucus
- Committee on the Second World War
- Environmental History Group
- Graduate Students' Committee
- History of Children and Youth Group
- Indigenous History Group
- International Committee of Historical Sciences
- Media And Communication History Committee
- Oral History Group/ Oral History Forum
- Political History Group
- Public History Group

=== Political history ===
Much of the teaching and writing of the first generation of professional historians dealt with Canadian political history, or more exactly constitutional history. Donald Wright says:

Neither sophisticated nor particularly interesting, English-Canadian historical writing was what it was: traditional, political, constitutional, at times sentimental, and too focused on the story of self-government, its development over time, and its ultimate achievement.... If it wasn't dry-as-dust constitutional history, it was after-dinner expressions of loyalty to Great Britain, heroic accounts of great men, and patriotic renderings of the Plains of Abraham and General Wolfe or of Queenston Heights and General Brock.

== The Conquest ==
The Conquest of New France has always been a central and contested theme of Canadian memory—as exemplified by an episode in 2009 when re-enactors were prevented from restaging the decisive 1759 battles in Québec. Cornelius Jaenen argues:

The Conquest has remained a difficult subject for French-Canadian historians because it can be viewed either as economically and ideologically disastrous or as a providential intervention to enable Canadians to maintain their language and religion under British rule. For virtually all Anglophone historians it was a victory for British military, political, and economic superiority which would eventually only benefit the conquered.

Historians of the 1950s tried to explain the economic inferiority of the French-Canadians by arguing that the Conquest:

destroyed an integral society and decapitated the commercial class; leadership of the conquered people fell to the Church; and, because commercial activity came to be monopolized by British merchants, national survival concentrated on agriculture.

At the other pole, are those Francophone historians who see the positive benefit of enabling the preservation of language, and religion and traditional customs under British rule. Scholars such as Donald Fyson have pointed to the legal system as a success, with the continuation of French civil law and the introduction of liberal modernity. French Canadian debates have escalated since the 1960s, as the Conquest is seen as a pivotal moment in the history of Québec's nationalism. Historian Jocelyn Létourneau suggested in the 21st century, "1759 does not belong primarily to a past that we might wish to study and understand, but, rather, to a present and a future that we might wish to shape and control."

"The Monument des Braves," begun in Québec in 1863, commemorated the Battle of Sainte-Foy the last victory won by the French in Canada during the Seven Years' War (French and Indian War). It began a wave of commemorations that took place across Canada between 1850 and 1930. They were designed to create memories and left out the harshness of the British conquest and bring Anglophones and Francophones closer together.

Anglophone historians, in sharp contrast, typically celebrated the Conquest as a victory for British military, political, and economic superiority that was a permanent benefit to the French.

== Loyalists ==
The Loyalists paid attention to their history, developing an image of themselves that they took great pride in. In 1898, Henry Coyne provided a glowing depiction:

The Loyalists, to a considerable extent, were the very cream of the population of the Thirteen Colonies. They represented in very large measure the learning, the piety, the gentle birth, the wealth and good citizenship of the British race in America, as well its devotion to law and order, British institutions, and the unity of the Empire. This was the leaven they brought to Canada, which has leavened the entire Dominion of this day.

According to Margaret Conrad and Alvin Finkel, Coyne's memorial expresses essential themes that have often been incorporated into patriotic celebrations. The Loyalist tradition, as explicated by Murray Barkley and Norman Knowles, includes:

The elite origins of the refugees, their loyalty to the British Crown, their suffering and sacrifice in the face of hostile conditions, their consistent anti-Americanism, and their divinely inspired sense of mission.

Conrad and Finkel point up some exaggerations. They note that a few Loyalists were part of the colonial elite, and most were loyal to all things British. A few suffered violence and hardship. However about 20 percent returned to the United States, and other Loyalists supported the United States in the War of 1812. Conrad and Finkel conclude:

in using their history to justify claims to superiority, descendants of the Loyalists abuse the truth and actually diminish their status in the eyes of their non-Loyalists neighbours....The scholars who argue that the Loyalists planted the seeds of Canadian liberalism or conservatism in British North America usually fail to take into account not only the larger context of political discussion that prevailed throughout the North Atlantic world, but also the political values brought to British North America by other immigrants in the second half of the 18th century.

== War of 1812 ==
Canadian historian C.P. Stacey famously remarked that memories of the War of 1812 makes everybody happy. The Americans think they whipped the British.

Canadians think of it equally pridefully as a war of defense in which their brave fathers, side-by-side, turned back the massed might of the United States and saved the country from conquest. And the English are the happiest of all, because they don't even know it happened.

Since the bicentennial in 2012, a steady stream of American and Canadian studies have appeared, and even a few from Britain. Old themes are covered in more depth. There is much more concern with French, Spanish, Native American, and African American sides of the story. New approaches centred on gender and race have appeared.

In a 2012 poll, 25% of all Canadians ranked their victory in the War of 1812 as the second most important part of their identity after free health care (53 per cent).

The Canadian government spent $28 million on three years of bicentennial events, exhibits, historic sites, re-enactments, and a new national monument. The official goal was to make Canadians aware that 1) Canada would not exist had the American invasion of 1812–15 been successful; 2) the end of the war laid the foundation for Confederation and the emergence of Canada as a free and independent nation; and 3) under the Canadian Crown, Canada's society retained its linguistic and ethnic diversity, in contrast to the greater conformity demanded by the American Republic.

In Toronto the "1812 Great Canadian Victory Party will bring the War of 1812...to life," promised the sponsors of a festival in November 2009. More specifically, Ontario celebrates the war, and Québec largely ignores it. Nationwide in 2009, 37% of Canadians thought Canada won the war, 15% thought it was a tie. But 39% know too little about it to say, including 63% in Québec.

The memory of the war of 1812 was not especially important in the decades that followed it. A powerful oligarchy closely tied to Britain controlled Upper Canada (Ontario), and their criteria for legitimacy was loyalty to London, rather than heroic episodes in the war of 1812. As result they did not promote the memory of the war.

=== First Nations ===
The War of 1812 is often celebrated in Ontario as a British victory for what would become Canada in 1867, but Canadian historians in recent decades look at it as a defeat for the First Nations of Canada, and also for the merchants of Montreal (who lost the fur trade of the Michigan-Minnesota area). The British had a long-standing goal of building a "neutral" but pro-British Indian buffer state in the American Midwest. They demanded a neutral Indian state at the peace conference in 1814 but failed to gain any of it because they had lost control of the region in the Battle of Lake Erie and the Battle of the Thames in 1813, where Tecumseh was killed. The British then abandoned the Indians south of the lakes. The royal elite of (what is now) Ontario gained much more power in the aftermath and used that power to repel American ideas such as democracy and republicanism, especially in those areas of Ontario settled primarily by Americans. Many of those settlers returned to the states and were replaced by immigrants from Britain who were imperial-minded. W. L. Morton says the war was a "stalemate" but the Americans "did win the peace negotiations." Arthur Ray says the war made "matters worse for the native people" as they lost military and political power. J.M. Bumsted says the war was a stalemate but regarding the Indians "was a victory for the American expansionists." John Herd Thompson and Stephen Randall say "the War of 1812's real losers were the Native peoples who had fought as Britain's ally."

== Economic history ==
Economic history was central to the new interpretations developing after 1900, in part because the economists and historians were collaborating using evidence from Canadian history.

=== Staples thesis ===
Harold Innis (1894–1952), based in the history department at the University of Toronto, and William Archibald Mackintosh (1895–1970), based in the economics department at Queen's University developed the Staples thesis. They argued that the Canadian Economy (beyond the level of subsistence farming) was primarily based on exports of a series of staples—fish, fur, timber, wheat—that shipped to Britain and the British Empire. Industrialization came much later. The thesis explains Canadian economic development as a lateral, east–west conception of trade. Innis argued that Canada developed as it did because of the nature of its staple commodities: raw materials, such as fish, fur, lumber, agricultural products, and minerals. This trading link cemented Canada's cultural links to Britain. The search for and exploitation of these staples led to the creation of institutions that defined the political culture of the nation and its regions. Innis, Influenced by the Frontier thesis of American historian Frederick Jackson Turner, added a sociological dimension. Innis argued that different staples led to the emergence of regional economies (and societies) within Canada. For instance, the staple commodity in Atlantic Canada was cod fishing. This industry was very decentralized, but also very co-operative. In western Canada the central staple was wheat. Wheat farming was a very independent venture, which led to a history of distrust of government and corporations in that part of the country. (Also important, however, were the shocks caused by volatility in the market for wheat and by the weather itself on the growing season.) In central Canada, the main staple was fur, and the fur trade dominated the economy for many years. This fur trade was controlled by large firms, such as the Hudson's Bay Company and thus produced the much more centralized, business-oriented society that today characterizes Montreal and Toronto.

Donald Creighton (1902–1979) was a leading historian who built upon the Staples thesis in his The Commercial Empire of the St-Lawrence: 1760–1850 (1937). His Laurentian thesis showed how the English merchant class came to dominate Canadian business through their control of the export of staples via the St-Lawrence River. They made Montreal economic, business and financial capital of Canada. In his enormously influential biography of John A. McDonald, Creighton argued that McDonald had built upon and extended the Laurentian model by his creation of the transcontinental railway. More than that, Creighton transformed Canadian political history. For years scholars had complained about the old-fashioned, narrow, constitutional approach. They hoped Creighton could modernize the field and he came through, by adding not just biography, but also social, cultural, and especially long-term economic patterns as the matrix on which Canadian politics was played out.

==== Core-periphery model ====
Innis depicted the relationship between regions of Canada as one of "heartland" to "hinterland": The periphery, or hinterland, is dominated by the core, or heartland. Because the heartland was dependent upon the search for and accumulation of staples (which were located in the hinterland) to perpetuate the economy, it sought to gain economic and political power by exploiting the hinterland. Historians continue to use elements of the Innis model, applying it for example to British Columbia. That province's economic structure exemplifies the "core-periphery" structure of intra-regional relationships. The core is metropolitan Vancouver, with its concentration of corporate management and transportation functions and manufacturing growth. It dominates an underdeveloped periphery that depends on production and export of staple commodities. However, the use of the core-hinterland model to describe the relationship of the Maritime Provinces to Ontario and Québec has been critiqued by maritime historian Ian McKay, who suggested that the economic input of Central Canada is lesser than would be expected with such a model.

==== Keynesian version ====
In the 1950s, Mackintosh revised the staples theory to position it inside the framework of Keynesian analysis. He argued that government expenditures on infrastructure for staple exports were a special case of Keynesian counter cyclical fiscal policy. It amounted to priming of the economic pump to induce private sector investment. At the University of Saskatchewan, a team of economists led by George Britnell, Mabel Timlin, Kenneth Buckley and Vernon Fowke, were followers of Innis and developed this approach into a "Saskatchewan school" of economic history. Fowke's Canadian Agricultural Policy: The Historical Pattern (1946), showed that agriculture was promoted as an "investment frontier," the profits from which were to go to interests other than agriculture. Canadian policy was never to develop agriculture so as to improve the conditions of those who cultivated the soil but to aid imperial military and political goals and provide profits for commercial interests.

== Whig history: Political history with a definite goal ==
Historian Allan Greer argues that Whig history was once the dominant style of scholarship. He says the:

interpretive schemes that dominated Canadian historical writing through the middle decades of the twentieth century were built on the assumption that history had a discernible direction and flow. Canada was moving towards a goal in the nineteenth century; whether this endpoint was the construction of a transcontinental, commercial, and political union, the development of parliamentary government, or the preservation and resurrection of French Canada, it was certainly a Good Thing. Thus the rebels of 1837 were quite literally on the wrong track. They lost because they had to lose; they were not simply overwhelmed by superior force, they were justly chastised by the God of History.

With the decline of Whig history, Canadian scholarship since the late 20th century has avoided overarching themes and concentrated on specialized research topics. No longer do they minimize conflict and violence. Military historians map troop movements in 1837–38. Imperial specialists explain how London approached the crisis. Economic historians measure the depth of financial and agrarian distress that soured the mood. Social historians reveal how ordinary people were caught up in the Rebellion. Greer concludes that:

The result has been a great advance in empirical knowledge: myths have been punctured, generalizations of the and qualified, and a wealth of factual data has been accumulated.

The downside in this minute particularism has been a loss of a broad overview or a sense of what it all meant, such as the Whig approach offered.

== Confederation ==
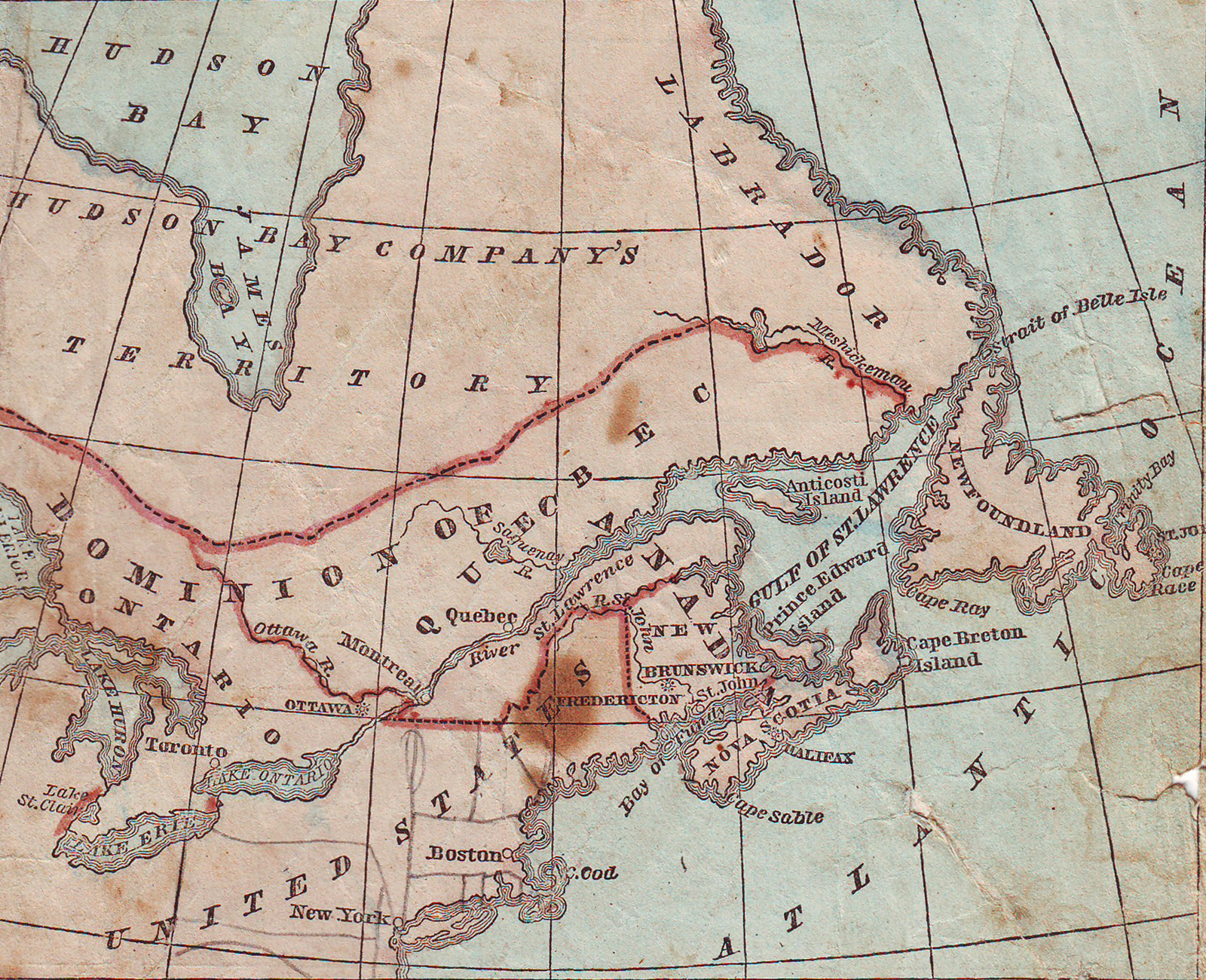
Map of the Eastern British Provinces in North America at the time of Canadian Confederation, 1867.

There is extensive scholarly debate on the role of political ideas in Canadian Confederation. Traditionally, historians regarded Canadian Confederation an exercise in political pragmatism that was essentially non-ideological. In the 1960s, historian P.B. Waite derided the references to political philosophers in the legislative debates on Confederation as "hot air". In Waite's view, Confederation was driven by pragmatic brokerage politics and competing interest groups.

In 1987, political scientist Peter J. Smith challenged the view that Canadian Confederation was non-ideological. Smith argued that Confederation was motivated by new political ideologies as much as the American and French Revolutions and that Canadian Confederation was driven by a Court Party ideology. Smith traces the origins of this ideology to eighteenth and nineteenth-century Britain, where political life was polarized between defenders of classical republican values of the Country Party and proponents of a new pro-capitalist ideology of the Court Party, which believed in centralizing political power. In British North America in the 1860s, the Court Party tradition was represented by the supporters of Confederation, whereas the anti-capitalist and agrarian Country Party tradition was embodied by the Anti-Confederates.

In a 2000 journal article, historian Ian McKay argued that Canadian Confederation was motivated by the ideology of liberalism and the belief in the supremacy of individual rights. McKay described Confederation as part of the classical liberal project of creating a "liberal order" in northern North America. Many Canadian historians have adopted McKay's liberal order framework as a paradigm for understanding Canadian history.

In 2008, historian Andrew Smith advanced a very different view of Confederation's ideological origins. He argues that in the four original Canadian provinces, the politics of taxation were a central issue in the debate about Confederation. Taxation was also central to the debate in Newfoundland, the tax-averse colony that rejected it. Smith argued Confederation was supported by many colonists who were sympathetic to a relatively interventionist, or statist, approach to capitalist development. Most classical liberals, who believed in free trade and low taxes, opposed Confederation because they feared that it would result in Big Government. The struggle over Confederation involved a battle between a staunchly individualist economic philosophy and a comparatively collectivist view of the state's proper role in the economy. According to Smith, the victory of the statist supporters of Confederation over their anti-statist opponents prepared the way for Sir John A. Macdonald's government to enact the protectionist National Policy and to subsidize major infrastructure projects such the Intercolonial and Pacific Railways.

In 2007, political scientist Janet Ajzenstat connected Canadian Confederation to the individualist ideology of John Locke. She argued that the union of the British North American colonies was motivated by a desire to protect individual rights, especially the rights to life, liberty, and property. She contends that the Fathers of Confederation were motivated by the values of the Enlightenment of the seventeenth and eighteenth centuries. She argues that their intellectual debts to Locke are most evident when one looks at the 1865 debates in the Province of Canada's legislature on whether or not union with the other British North American colonies would be desirable.

== Ethnic history ==
Roberto Perin looks at the historiography of Canadian ethnic history and finds two alternative methodologies. One is more static and emphasizes how closely immigrant cultures replicate the Old World. This approach tends to be filiopietistic. The alternative approach has been influenced by the recent historiography on labor, urban, and family history. It sees the immigrant community as an essentially North American phenomenon and integrates it into the mainstream of Canadian culture.

== Historians change their perspective ==
Since the 1980s, historians have sharply revised their approach to Canadian history. Political history had been the dominant mode. The flagship Canadian Historical Review was heavily weighted toward political history, giving priority to macro themes such as elite politicians and statesmen, public institutions, and national issues. By 2000, however, the same journal gave two-thirds of its space to social history. Furthermore, micro topics with a narrow geographical and chronological focus have largely replaced wide-lens macro themes. Glassford argues that:

The Big Questions are now seen to be societally based, and emanate from a cultural interpretation of such fundamental concepts as social class, gender, ethnicity, race, religion, and sexual orientation. Micro-analysis has at least as much validity in the new model as macro.

A backlash erupted from conservative historians, typified by political and military specialist Jack Granatstein who charged that social historians had "killed" Canadian history by displacing the traditional Whig narrative of upward political, diplomatic, and military progress with microscopic studies of the underclass, the trivial, and the inconsequential.". Granatstein recalls the backlash:

As the old white males rallied themselves and fought back, the resulting war produced heavy casualties, much bloodshed, and vast expenditures of time and effort. The political historians believed that narrative was important, that chronology mattered, and that the study of the past could not neglect the personalities of the leaders and the nations they lead. The social historians had no interest in the history of the "elites" and almost none in political history, except to denounce repressiveness of Canadian governments and business....Blame had to be allocated. Canada was guilty of genocide against the Indians, the bombing of Germany, the ecological rape of the landscape, and so on. Their aim was to use history, or their version of it, to cure white males of their sense of superiority.

=== Women ===
The woman's history movement began in the 1970s and grew rapidly across Canadian universities, attracting support from history departments and other disciplines as well. The Canadian Committee on Women's History (CCWH) was founded in 1975. Franca Iacovetta reported in 2007:

Although the most prestigious awards and endowed chairs still go mostly to men, and men still outnumber women at the full professor rank, the greater influence of feminist historians within the wider profession is evident in their increased presence as journal and book series editors, the many scholarly prizes, the strong presence of women's and gender history on conference programs, and the growing number of their students who are in full-time positions.

==== Québec ====
The history of women in Québec was generally neglected before 1980. The advent of the feminist movement, combined with the "New social history" that featured the study of ordinary people, created a new demand for a historiography of women. The first studies, emerged from a feminist perspective, and stressed their role as the terms who had been reduced to inferiority in a world controlled by men. Feminists sought the family itself as the centrepiece of the patriarchal system where fathers and husbands oppressed and alienated women. The second stage came when historians presented a more positive and balanced view. Research has often been interdisciplinary, using insights from feminist theory, literature, anthropology and sociology to study gender relations, socialization, reproduction, sexuality, and unpaid work. Labour and family history have proved particularly open to these themes.

=== Environmental history ===
Canadian historians have always paid close attention to geography, but until the 1980s they largely ignored the Canadian environment, except to point how cold the northerly nation is. More recently, explorers have ventured into new areas, but no overarching or major reinterpretation has swept the field. Two of the most widely noted books are Tina Loo, States of Nature: Conserving Canada's Wildlife in the Twentieth Century (2006), and John Sandlos, Hunters at the Margin: Native People and Wildlife Conservation in the Northwest Territories (2007).

== Publications ==
Scholarly articles and in-depth reviews of new historical studies appear in these journals:

- Acadiensis – Covers Atlantic Canada
- Alberta History
- American Review of Canadian Studies
- British Columbia History
- Bulletin d'histoire politique politics in Quebec
- Canadian Bulletin of Medical History
- Canada's History – Formerly The Beaver (1920–2010), short popular essays.
- Canadian Historical Review – Major scholarly journal.
- Histoire sociale/Social History – Focus on Canada.
- Journal of the Canadian Historical Association / Revue de la Société historique du Canada
- Labour/Le Travail
- London Journal of Canadian Studies – Annual since 1984.
- Manitoba History
- Ontario History
- Québec Studies
- Queen's Quarterly cultural studies; established in 1893
- Revue d'histoire de l'Amérique française on French Wikipedia – Focus on Québec.
- Saskatchewan History
- Urban History Review – Revue d'histoire urbaine – Published 1972-2016.

== See also ==
- Canada Vignettes
- Canadian identity
- Heritage Minutes
- List of museums in Canada
- War of 1812 Bicentennial

== Notes ==
=== Sources ===
- Berger, Carl (1986). The writing of Canadian history: aspects of English-Canadian historical writing since 1900 (second ed.). University of Toronto Press. ISBN 978-0-8020-6568-1.
- Buckner, Phillip; Reid, John G., eds. (2012). Remembering 1759: The Conquest of Canada in Historical Memory. University of Toronto Press. ISBN 978-1-4426-9924-3.
- Conrad, Margaret; Finkel, Alvin (2006). History of the Canadian Peoples: Beginnings to 1867 (4th ed.). Pearson Longman. ISBN 978-0-321-27008-5.
- Wright, Donald A. (2015). Donald Creighton: A Life in History. University of Toronto Press, Scholarly Publishing Division. ISBN 978-1-4426-2030-8. – Scholarly biography of major historian.
