= Andrew McLuhan =

Andrew McLuhan (born in 1978) is the founder and director of the McLuhan Institute, continuing the work of his father and grandfather in the study of how media and technology affect individuals and society. Andrew McLuhan's father, Eric McLuhan, was the eldest son of Marshall McLuhan, a media "explorer." Toward the end of Marshall McLuhan's life, his son was his personal assistant and also helped to co-write some of Marshall McLuhan's books. Andrew McLuhan stepped into a similar role of being a personal assistant for his own father.

The McLuhan Institute holds the personal library of his father Eric McLuhan, and papers of his grandfather Marshall McLuhan, which serves as a nucleus for methods to understand the societal effects of evolving technologies.

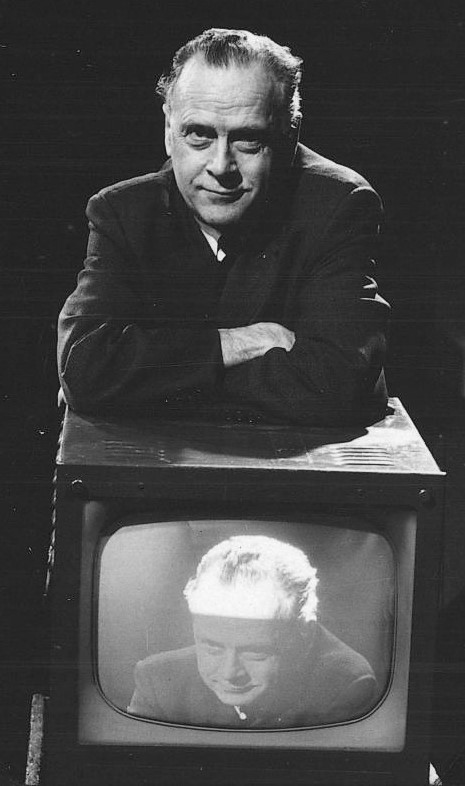
Marshall McLuhan; Andrew McLuhan's grandfather

== Biography ==
=== Early years ===
Andrew McLuhan was two-and-a-half years old when his grandfather Marshall McLuhan died in 1980. Regarding the handling of media in his childhood, watching television was allowed only after a "sufficient" amount of reading was accomplished each day.

Andrew McLuhan grew up in Toronto, where he attended high school, and then finished his final year of high school education in rural Ontario, in Prince Edward County.

He apprenticed in and then ran his own upholstery business for a decade. He was a member of a punk rock band and also served weekly as a projectionist at a local movie theater before video replaced film reels.

=== Development towards founding the McLuhan Institute ===
Starting when Andrew McLuhan was thirty years old and continuing for almost a decade—ending with his father's death—he served as a personal assistant for his father Eric McLuhan who was teaching, giving lectures and writing books, to carry on the work started by Marshall McLuhan.

Andrew McLuhan catalogued the extensive annotated library of his grandfather, Marshall McLuhan. Marshall McLuhan's personal library and archives were inscribed on the UNESCO Memory of the World Register in November 2017, and are held in Toronto and in Ottawa. This was Andrew McLuhan's first major research project.

Andrew McLuhan founded the McLuhan Institute in the summer of 2017, a year before his father died.

In the early 2020s Andrew McLuhan was an associate editor for the Winnipeg School of Communication.

== The McLuhan Institute ==
The McLuhan Institute (Note: Not to be confused with the McLuhan Foundation and the McLuhan Centre) is located in Prince Edward County, Ontario, Canada.

The property has a two-story barn attached to a three-story barn. The smaller barn had been converted by his father into an office and archive.

The McLuhan Institute maintains the artifacts which it has from the McLuhan family, such as the working library of Eric McLuhan, which consists of about six-thousand books. Andrew McLuhan gives talks, workshops and teaches classes, for example, on Marshall McLuhan's foundational book Understanding Media, which was published in 1964.

Andrew McLuhan intends that the McLuhan Institute will carry on with research, education, archive and exploration, and also with a focus on the arts as a way of relating to changes brought about by media and technology.

== Personal life ==
Andrew McLuhan is married and has children.

He explained that a large reason for his not going to university after completing high school is that academia in general discouraged those pursuing the ideas of his grandfather Marshall McLuhan.

Andrew McLuhan grew up in a Roman Catholic family and when he was younger, he contemplated becoming a priest, but then in his teenage years he became disinterested in spirituality. In 2026 he was quoted as saying: “I think in the same way that a certain amount of experience and maturity allowed the intellectual spark to reach me, perhaps the same can be said for the spiritual spark. I consider myself a student in both areas — it's something I wrestle with.... It's an ongoing journey.”. Andrew McLuhan wrote in an essay for the Templeton Foundation: "I pretty much dropped out of both school and church as a teenager. I basically stopped going to church not long after my Confirmation, and I only stuck around high school long enough to get my diploma. I’ve come back to both education and the Church in my own way."

== Published works ==
=== Author ===
- written matter: poems and photos (Revelore Press, 2021)

=== Co-editor ===
- Beyond Media Literacy (Büchner-Verlag, 2023)
- Marshall McLuhan: Then and Now (Büchner-Verlag, 2026)

=== Foreword ===
- The Forgotten Art of Being Ordinary: A Human Manifesto in the Age of the Metaverse (Matt Holt Books, 2023)
- The Medium Picture (University of Georgia Press, 2025)

== See also ==
- The medium is the message
- Media ecology
- Toronto school of communication theory
- Tetrad of media effects
- Fordham Experiment
- Edmund Snow Carpenter
