= Eric McLuhan =

Canadian communications theorist (1942–2018)

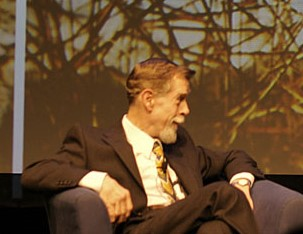
- McLuhan in 2008
- Born: January 19, 1942
- Died: May 18, 2018 (aged 76); Bogotá, Colombia
- Education: Wisconsin State University (BSc) University of Dallas (MA, PhD)
- Occupation: Communication theorist
- Children: includes Andrew McLuhan
- Parent(s): Marshall McLuhan, Corinne Lewis
- Website: ericmcluhan.com

Eric Marshall McLuhan (19 January 1942 – 18 May 2018) was a communication theorist, son of philosopher Marshall McLuhan.

== Biography ==
Eric McLuhan was the eldest of Marshall McLuhan's six children. He received his BSc in communications from Wisconsin State University in 1972 and his M.A. and PhD in English Literature from the University of Dallas in 1980 and 1982. In 2007, he received the Neil Postman Award for Career Achievement in Public Intellectual Activity from the Media Ecology Association. In 2011, the University of St. Michael's College in Toronto, Canada awarded him an L.L.D. of Sacred Letters.

Eric McLuhan coined the term "Media ecology" while teaching at Fordham University in 1967–68 with his father Marshall McLuhan. According to Eric: "Media Ecology is a term I invented when we were at Fordham. I discussed it with Postman and he ran with it."

Marshall and Eric McLuhan co-authored the books Laws of Media: The New Science (1990), Media and Formal Cause (2011), and Theories of Communication (2011). According to McLuhan associate Dean Motter, Eric also collaborated with his father on some books as a ghostwriter.

His teaching experiences were in the McLuhan Program in Culture and Technology at the University of Toronto and with the McLuhan Program International. He was Director of Media Studies at the Harris Institute for the Arts in Toronto for 17 years. Prior to that he taught and tutored at York University, Dawson College and Ontario College of Art. Likewise, he was a founding partner at McLuhan and Davies Communications. He also performed the original Fordham Experiment.

McLuhan was the author of Electric Language (1998), The Role of Thunder in Finnegans Wake (1997) and The Sensus Communis, Synesthesia, and the Soul: An Odyssey (2015). He was also editor of the journal McLuhan Studies and has overseen several collections of his father's work: The Book of Probes (2011), Marshall McLuhan Unbound (2005, with Terrence Gordon), The Medium and the Light (2010); and the co-editor of Essential McLuhan (1997, with Frank Zingrone). Recent work included a collaboration with mime Wayne D. Constantineau, produced in a series called The Human Equation (BPS Books), which curiously included a board game. Also forthcoming is: The Dance of the Ages: Egyptian Art of the Old Kingdom and Its Relevance to the Twenty-First Century, Cambridge Scholars Press.

He lived in Ontario, Canada, continuing in retirement to work on new books, projects & collections, his father's works, his own and with collaborators.

In 2017, his son Andrew established the McLuhan Institute, which houses the personal library of Eric McLuhan. The McLuhan Institute is located in Prince Edward County, Ontario.

He died in Bogotá, a day after delivering the inaugural speech for the Doctorate in Communication at University of La Sabana.

== List of works ==
- City as Classroom (with Marshall McLuhan, Kathryn Hutchon), 1977
- Laws of Media: The New Science (with Marshall McLuhan), U of Toronto Press, 1988
- The Role of Thunder in Finnegans Wake, U of Toronto Press, 1997
- Electric Language: Understanding the Present, Stoddart, 1998
- The Human Equation, Book I: The Constant in Human Development and Culture from Pre-Literacy to Post-Literacy (with W. D. Constantineau), BPS Books, 2010
- Media and Formal Cause (with Marshall McLuhan), NeoPoeisis Press, 2011
- Theories of Communication (with Marshall McLuhan), Peter Lang, 2011
- The Human Equation, Book II: The Science of Investigation (with W. D. Constantineau), BPS Books, 2011
- The Human Equation, Book III: Know Thyself: Action and Perception (with W. D. Constantineau), BPS Books, 2012
- The Human Equation, Book IV: Mime and Media I (with W. D. Constantineau), BPS Books, 2016 [Forthcoming]
- The Human Equation, Book V: Mime and Media II (with W. D. Constantineau), BPS Books, 2016 [Forthcoming]
- Cynic Satire, Cambridge Scholars Publishing, 2015
- The Sensus Communis: Synesthesia, and the Soul, BPS Books, 2015

Editor

- Essential McLuhan (with F. Zingrone), Stoddart, 1995
- Who Was Marshall McLuhan? (with F. Zingrone, W. Constantineau), Stoddart, 1996
- The Medium and the Light: Writings on Religion by Marshall McLuhan, (With Jacek Schlarek) Stoddart, 1998
- The Book of Probes (with W. Kuhns), Gingko Press, 2004
- McLuhan Unbound, Gingko Press, 2005

== See also ==
- Tetrad of media effects
