= The Mechanical Bride =

1951 book by Marshall McLuhan

The Mechanical Bride: Folklore of Industrial Man
- Author: Marshall McLuhan
- Language: English
- Published: 1951 Vanguard Press (New York)
- Publication place: United States
- Media type: Print
- Pages: 157 p. illus. 28 cm

The Mechanical Bride: Folklore of Industrial Man (1951) is a study of popular culture by Marshall McLuhan, treating newspapers, comics, and advertisements as poetic texts.

Like his later 1962 book The Gutenberg Galaxy, The Mechanical Bride is unique and composed of a number of short essays that can be read in any order – what he styled the "mosaic approach" to writing a book. Each essay begins with a newspaper or magazine article or an advertisement, followed by McLuhan's analysis thereof. The analyses bear on aesthetic considerations as well as on the implications behind the imagery and text. McLuhan chose the ads and articles included in his book not only to draw attention to their symbolism and their implications for the corporate entities that created and disseminated them, but also to mull over what such advertising implies about the wider society at which it is aimed.

== Summary ==
McLuhan is concerned by the size and the intentions of the North American culture industry. "Ours is the first age in which many thousands of the best-trained individual minds have made it a full-time business to get inside the collective public mind," McLuhan writes in his preface to the book. He believes the modern "helpless state engendered by prolonged mental rutting is the effect of many ads and much entertainment alike." McLuhan hopes Bride can reverse this process.

By using artifacts of popular culture as a means to enlighten the public, McLuhan hopes the public can consciously observe the effects of popular culture on them.

McLuhan compares his method to the sailor in Edgar Allan Poe's short story "A Descent into the Maelström". The sailor, McLuhan writes, saves himself by studying the whirlpool and by co-operating with it. Likewise, the book is not interested in attacking the strong currents of advertising, radio, and the press.

The book argues anger and outrage are not the proper responses to the culture industry. "The time for anger...is in the early stages of a new process," McLuhan says, "the present stage is extremely advanced." Amusement is the proper strategy. This is why McLuhan uses punning questions that border on silly or absurd after each visual example.

On the technique of amusement McLuhan quotes Poe's sailor, when he's locked into the whirlpool's walls looking at floating objects:

"I must have been delirious, for I even sought amusement in speculating upon the relative velocities of their several descents towards the foam below." [italics original]

This amusement, McLuhan argues, born "of his rational detachment as a spectator of his own situation," saved the sailor's life. By adopting the position of Poe's sailor, readers of Bride can escape from the whirlpool of popular culture.

== Origins ==
Marshall McLuhan's interest in the critical study of popular culture was influenced by the 1933 book Culture and Environment by F. R. Leavis (with Denys Thompson) and Wyndham Lewis' 1932 book Doom of Youth, which uses similar exhibits.

During the 1940s, McLuhan regularly held lectures with slides of advertisements analysing them. He first referred to the present era as the Age of the Mechanical Bride in 1945, during a series of lectures in Windsor, Ontario. McLuhan had planned on publishing these lectures and slides since before 1945.

During the thirties and forties, many "exposé" books critiquing the advertising industry were published but McLuhan's book was different. While critical, the tone of the essays was admiring at times, impressed with the skills of advertisers. Despite the influence, McLuhan was far more playful in The Mechanical Bride than Leavis was in Culture and Environment.

In June 1948, McLuhan received an advance of $250 for the publication of The Folklore of Industrial Man from Vanguard Press. The tentative title would later become the subtitle.

The title The Mechanical Bride comes from a piece by the French avant-garde artist Marcel Duchamp, titled The Bride Stripped Bare By Her Bachelors, Even.

The book underwent several title changes over four manuscripts before McLuhan settled on Bride. The first manuscript was titled Guide to Chaos. The following three manuscripts were titled Typhon in America, after the Ancient Greek mythological monster. The eventual title of the book reflects McLuhan's concern about the merging of sex and technology in advertising.

McLuhan was frustrated by the editorial efforts of Vanguard Press. He resisted requests to cut entries, to expand on subjects, give examples, underline a point, or generally make the book easier for readers to understand. He would verbally abuse Vanguard Press staff, accusing editors of wearing him down with editorial requests. He began to suffer from severe headaches during this period, possibly products of the stress, anger, and frustration of his dealings with Vanguard.

The Mechanical Bride was published in the fall of 1951. The book was well-reviewed but it was not a financial success, only selling a few hundred copies. Biographer Philip Marchand reports that after the publication, McLuhan complained of a vague "homosexual influence in the publishing world, that was horrified by the masculine vigor of his prose and trying to castrate his text." McLuhan bought one thousand copies and sold them individually to bookshops and students. By the 1970s, hardcover first editions of The Mechanical Bride became sought after items in the rare book business.

== Examples of advertisements ==
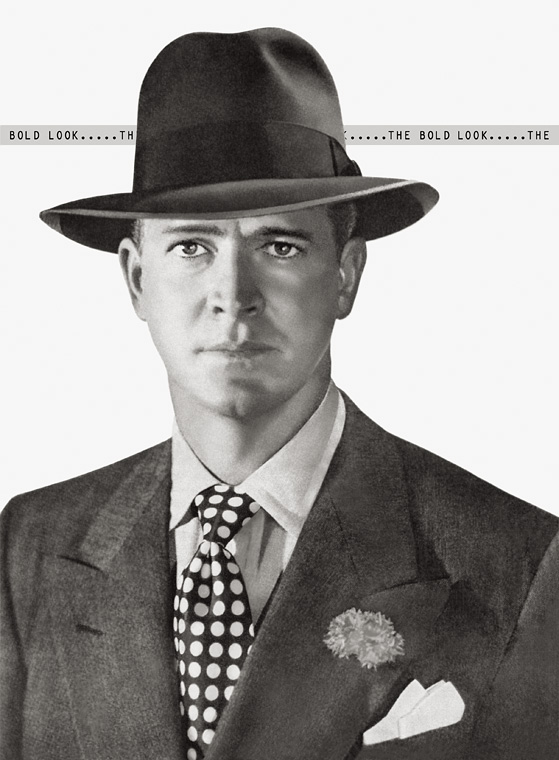
Does the Bold Look mean that the crooner and his tummyache are finished? (p. 71)

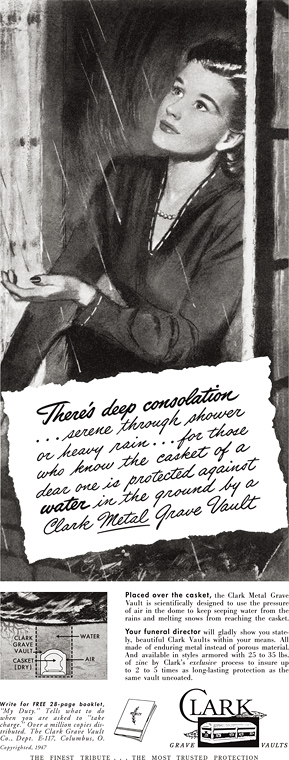
The more the burier, said Digby O'Dell? (p. 15)

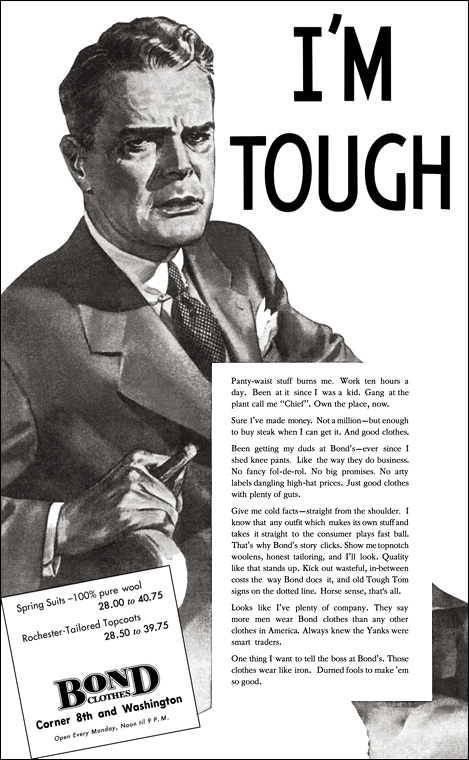
Can you see through his adnoise? (p. 130)

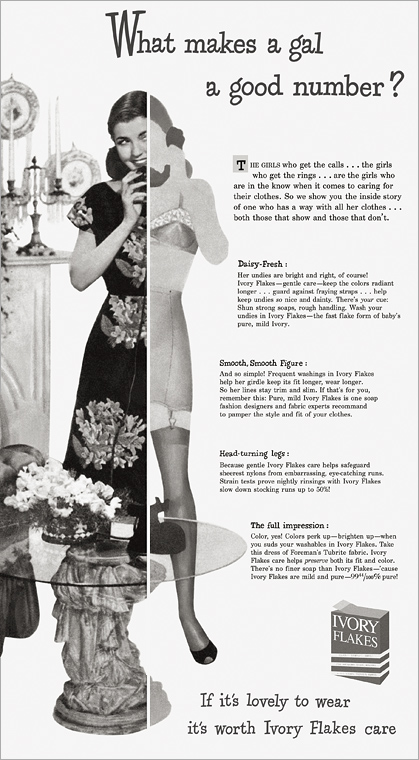
Can the feminine body keep pace with the demands of the textile industry? (p. 95)

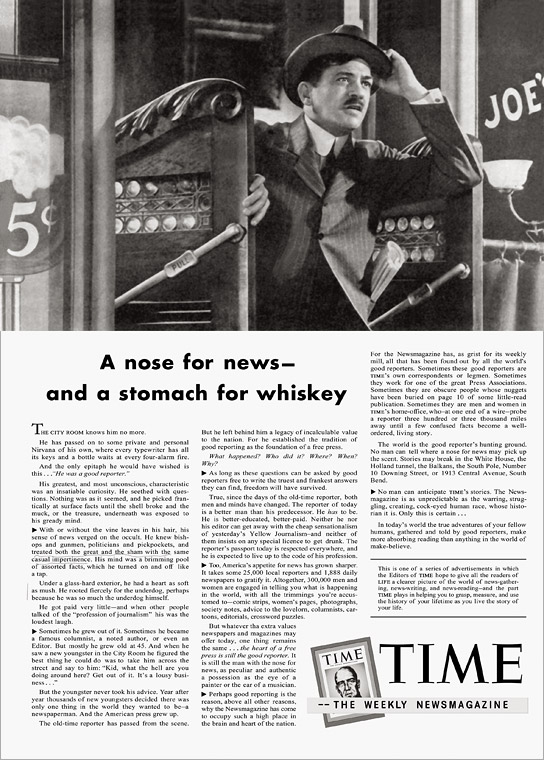
Why do newsmen pose as the last romantics? Or is it the first romantics? (p. 8)

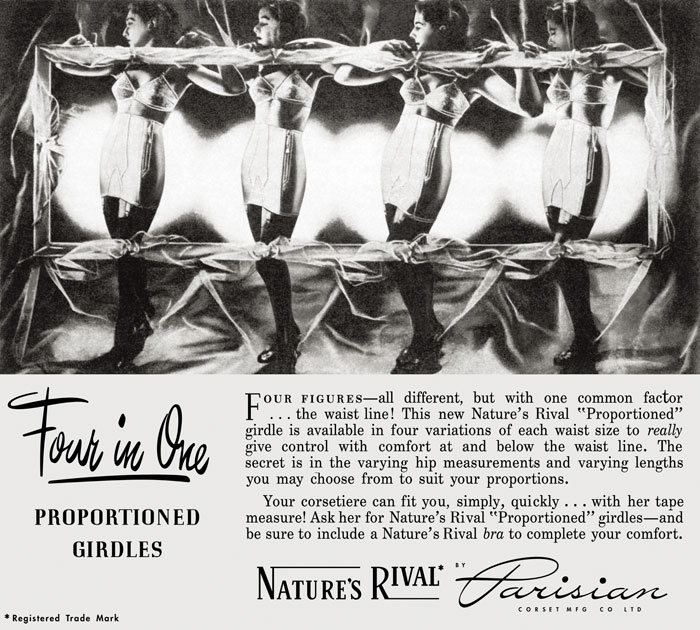
Did you notice the Model-T bodies of the women in that revived 1930 movie last night? (p. 94)

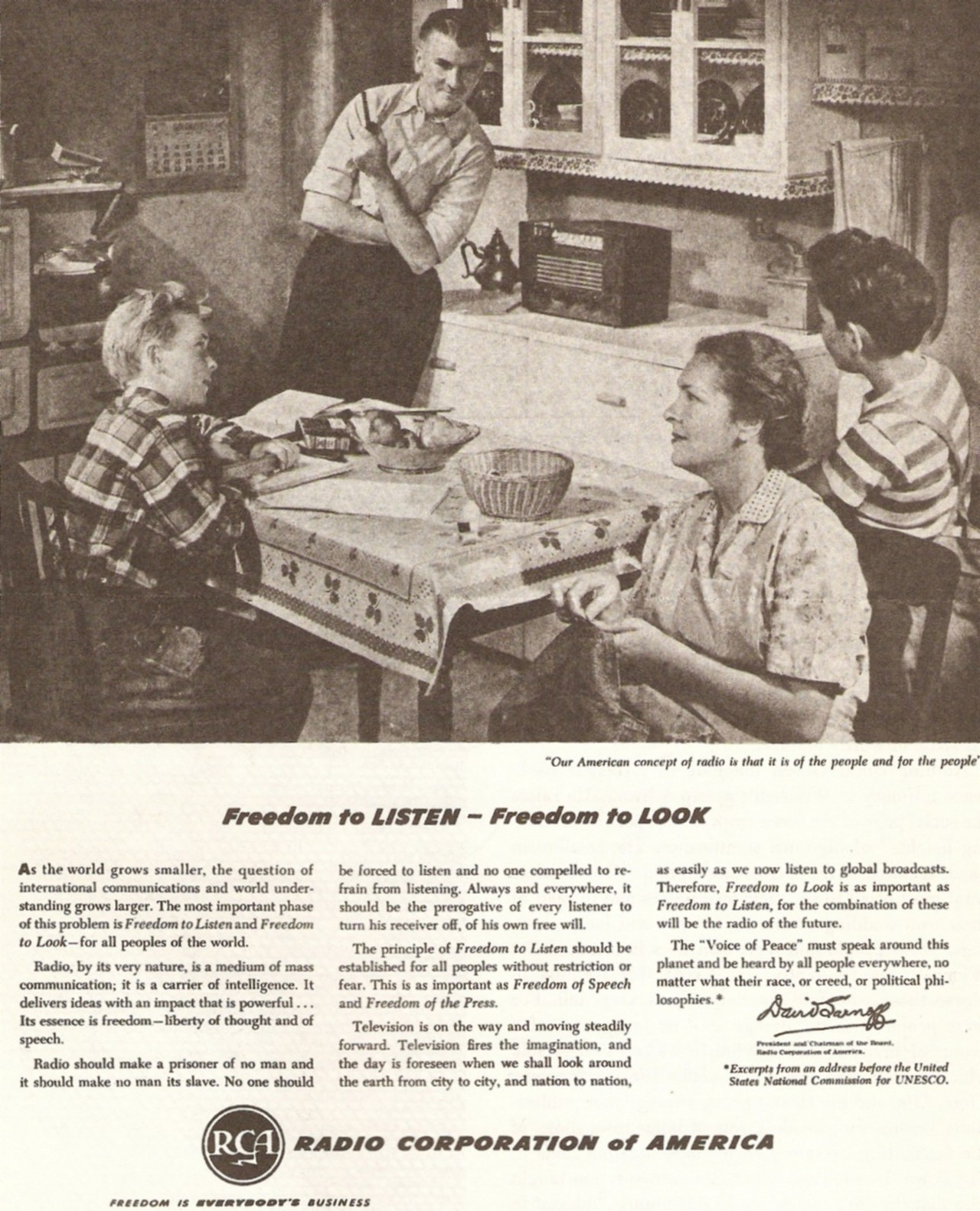
The rustic scene accentuates the positively phoney? (p. 20)

== Notes ==
=== Bibliography ===
- Marchand, Philip (1989). Marshall McLuhan: the Medium and the Messenger: a Biography. Toronto: Random House. ISBN 9780262631860.
