= From Cliché to Archetype =

- Authors: Marshall McLuhan, Wilfred Watson
- Language: English
- Subjects: Clichés, archetypes
- Publisher: Viking Press
- Publication date: 1970
- ISBN: 0-670-33093-0

From Cliché to Archetype is a 1970 book by Marshall McLuhan and Canadian poet Wilfred Watson, in which the authors discuss the various implications of the verbal cliché and of the archetype. One major facet in McLuhan's overall framework introduced in this book that is seldom noticed is the provision of a new term that actually succeeds the global village: the global theater.

In McLuhan's terms, a cliché is a "normal" action, phrase, etc. which becomes so often used that we are "anesthetized" to its effects.

An example of this given by McLuhan is Eugène Ionesco's play The Bald Soprano, whose dialogue consists entirely of phrases Ionesco pulled from an Assimil language book. "Ionesco originally put all these idiomatic English clichés into literary French which presented the English in the most absurd aspect possible."

McLuhan's archetype "is a quoted extension, medium, technology or environment." "Environment" would also include the kinds of "awareness" and cognitive shifts brought upon people by it, not totally unlike the psychological context Carl Jung described.

McLuhan also posits that there is a factor of interplay between the cliché and the archetype, or a "doubleness":

Another theme of the Wake [Finnegans Wake] that helps in the understanding of the paradoxical shift from cliché to archetype is 'past time are pastimes.' The dominant technologies of one age become the games and pastimes of a later age. In the 20th century, the number of 'past times' that are simultaneously available is so vast as to create cultural anarchy. When all the cultures of the world are simultaneously present, the work of the artist in the elucidation of form takes on new scope and new urgency. Most men are pushed into the artist's role. The artist cannot dispense with the principle of 'doubleness' or 'interplay' because this type of hendiadys dialogue is essential to the very structure of consciousness, awareness, and autonomy.

McLuhan relates the cliché-to-archetype process to the Theater of the Absurd:

Pascal, in the seventeenth century, tells us that the heart has many reasons of which the head knows nothing. The Theater of the Absurd is essentially a communicating to the head of some of the silent languages of the heart which in two or three hundred years it has tried to forget all about. In the seventeenth century world the languages of the heart were pushed down into the unconscious by the dominant print cliché.

The "languages of the heart," or what McLuhan would otherwise define as oral culture, were thus made archetype by means of the printing press, and turned into cliché.

The satellite medium, McLuhan states, encloses the Earth in a man-made environment, which "ends 'Nature' and turns the globe into a repertory theater to be programmed." All previous environments (book, newspaper, radio, etc.) and their artifacts are retrieved under these conditions ("past times are pastimes"). McLuhan thereby meshes this into the term global theater. It serves as an update to his older concept of the global village, which, in its own definitions, can be said to be subsumed into the overall condition described by that of the global theater.
