= Sheila Watson (writer) =

Canadian novelist, critic and teacher (1909–1998)

- Born: Sheila Martin Doherty; October 24, 1909; New Westminster, British Columbia, Canada
- Died: February 1, 1998 (aged 88); Nanaimo, British Columbia, Canada
- Education: University of British Columbia (BA, MA); University of Toronto (PhD)
- Occupation: Professor
- Spouse: Wilfred Watson (m. 1941)
- Writing career
- Language: English
- Notable work: The Double Hook
- Notable awards: Lorne Pierce Medal

Sheila Martin Watson (24 October 1909 – 1 February 1998) was a Canadian novelist, critic and teacher. She "is best known for her modernist novel, The Double Hook." The Canadian Encyclopedia declares that: "Publication of Watson's novel The Double Hook (1959) marks the start of contemporary writing in Canada."

== Life ==
She was born Sheila Martin Doherty at New Westminster, British Columbia. She grew up on the grounds of the provincial mental hospital where her father, Dr. Charles Edward Doherty, was the superintendent until his death in 1922.

After studying at Vancouver's Convent of the Sacred Heart, Sheila Doherty finished her university studies at the University of British Columbia, where she received her B.A. in 1931 and M.A. in 1933. She then worked as an elementary and high school teacher throughout British Columbia – including two years in Dog Creek (1935–1937), which served as a basis for her second novel, Deep Hollow Creek. She married Canadian poet Wilfred Watson in 1941.

Sheila Watson taught at Moulton Ladies College in Toronto between 1946 and 1948. From 1948 to 1950, she was a sessional lecturer at the University of British Columbia.

Watson wrote The Double Hook between 1952 and 1954 in Calgary and revised it during a year-long stay in Paris, from 1955 to 1956. She was unable to find a publisher. "T.S. Eliot at Faber & Faber, Cecil Day-Lewis at Chatto & Windus, and Rupert Hart-Davis all turned it down."

In 1957, Watson began doctoral studies at the University of Toronto, writing her thesis on Wyndham Lewis under the direction of Marshall McLuhan. Unusually, she was older than her PhD advisor by two years, her birth year being 1909 and his being 1911. Her doctoral dissertation, Wyndham Lewis and Expressionism was finally completed in 1965. By then, though, Watson was already well known in Canadian academe.

In 1959, The Double Hook was published, and instantly recognized as a modern classic. "All 3,000 copies of the initial print run were sold. Supporters such as ... McLuhan, as well as Yale formalist Cleanth Brooks, saw it as a literary landmark ushering the Canadian novel out of its regional confines. Professor Fred Salter ... called it 'the most brilliant piece of fiction ever written in Canada'."

The Canadian Broadcasting Corporation approached Watson to option the film rights to The Double Hook. However, because they would not give her veto rights over the script, she turned them down.

In 1961, Watson was hired as a professor of English at the University of Alberta. "In Edmonton the Watsons became part of an active circle of writers and established the literary magazine,The White Pelican in 1970 along with Douglas Barbour, Stephen Scobie, John Orrell, Dorothy Livesay, and artist Norman Yates." Watson remained the founding editor of the White Pelican for its brief existence (1971–1975). White Pelican Publications published Lions at her Face, the first book by Miriam Mandel, which won the Governor General's Award in 1973.

In 1984, Watson edited the Collected Poems of Miriam Mandel. Watson retired in 1975. In 1976, she and her husband moved to Nanaimo, where they died in 1998.

== Writing ==
Watson is best known for her modernist novel The Double Hook (1959), which is considered "a seminal work in the development of contemporary Canadian literature." "The Double Hook presents in concise, symbolic terms a drama of social disintegration and redemption, set in an isolated BC community.... These themes are presented in a style which itself balances on a "double hook": it is simultaneously local and universal, realistic and symbolic."

Watson has said the "double hook" of her title refers to the idea "that when you fish for the glory you catch the darkness too. That if you hook twice the glory you hook twice the fear." She explained that her novel is "about how people are driven, how if they have no art, how if they have no tradition, how if they have no ritual, they are driven in one of 2 ways, either towards violence or towards insensibility – if they have no mediating rituals which manifest themselves in what I suppose we call art forms."

In 1992, Watson published a novel, Deep Hollow Creek, which she had written in the 1930s. It was shortlisted that year for the Governor General's Award. "Deep Hollow Creek treats many of the same themes" as The Double Hook "in a manner which is more direct and conventional, but no less elliptical and challenging. It is fascinating to imagine the ways in which Canadian fiction might have been transformed if this startling and brilliant novel had been published at the time of its first composition."

In the 1950s, Watson published three interlinked stories, and a fourth in 1970, dealing with the family of Sophocles' Oedipus in a contemporary, realistic setting. The most critically discussed of these is "Antigone", a setting of the story of Creon and Antigone in the wilds of British Columbia.

== Recognition ==
Watson was awarded the Royal Society of Canada's Lorne Pierce Medal in 1984.

The third epigraph of Canadian novelist Margaret Atwood's 2000 novel The Blind Assassin reads:

The word is a flame burning in a dark glass. – Sheila Watson

According to Nathalie Cooke, this is from Deep Hollow Creek, and it announces Atwood's third dominant theme, the power of the word itself.

A biography, Always Someone to Kill the Doves: A Life of Sheila Watson by F.T. Flahiff was published in 2005.

The University of St. Michael's College held a two-day event, "Celebrating Sheila," on October 24 and 25, 2009, to mark the 100th anniversary of Watson's birth and the 50th anniversary of the publication of The Double Hook.

In 2015, Joseph Pivato edited Sheila Watson: Essays on Her Works which includes new essays on her life and work as an author, editor and mentor.

== Publications ==
=== Novels ===
- The Double Hook. Toronto: McClelland & Stewart, New Canadian Library, 1959. ISBN 0-7710-9998-3 ISBN 978-0-7710-9998-4
- Sous l'oeil de coyote. (trans. of The Double Hook by Arlette Francière). Montreal: Editions La Presse, 1976.
- Deep Hollow Creek. Toronto: McClelland & Stewart, New Canadian Library, 1992. ISBN 978-0-7710-8823-0

=== Stories ===
- "Brother Oedipus." Queen's Quarterly (Summer 1954).
- "The Black Farm." Queen's Quarterly (Summer 1956).
- "Antigone." The Tamarack Review (Spring 1959).
- Sheila Watson: A Collection. Toronto: Coach House P, 1974.
- "The Rumble Seat." Open Letter 3.1 (1975)
- Four Stories. Toronto: Coach House P, 1979.
- And the Four Animals Toronto: Coach House P, 1980.
- Five Stories. Toronto: Coach House P, 1984.
- A Father's Kingdom: The Complete Short Fiction. Toronto: McClelland & Stewart, New Canadian Library, 2004. ISBN 0-7710-3488-1 ISBN 978-0-7710-3488-6

=== Essays ===
- "A Question of Portraiture." The Tamarack Review (Autumn 1963).
- "The Great War: Wyndham Lewis and the Underground Press." arts/canada (Winter 1965).
- "Canada and Wyndham Lewis the Artist." Canadian Literature (Winter 1968).
- "Artist Ape as Crowd-master." in Explorations Ed. Marshall McLuhan, sup. The Varsity Graduate (May 1964).
- "Myth and Counter-myth." White Pelican (Winter 1974).
- "Swift and Ovid: The Development of Metasatire." The Humanities Association Bulletin (Spring 1967).
- "Power: Nude or Naked." in Explorations Ed. Marshall McLuhan, sup. The Varsity Graduate (December 1965).
- "Michael Ondaatje: The Mechanization of Death." White Pelican (Fall 1972).
- "Gertrude Stein: The Style is the Machine." White Pelican (Autumn 1973).
- "What I'm Going to Do." Open Letter 3.1 (1975).
- "How to Read Ulysses," Sheila Watson: Essays on Her Works (2015).

=== Edited ===
- Habits and Hangups (Study Guide for Modern Consciousness course). Edmonton: Athabasca University, 1979. Written and edited with Mary Hamilton.
- The Collected Poems of Miriam Mandel. Edmonton: Longspoon Press, 1984.

=== Fonds ===
Watson named her friend, English professor Dr. Fred T. Flahiff, as her literary executor and sent him her archives between 1994 and 1998. When Watson died in 1998, Flahiff also donated books from her personal library to the University of St. Michael's College. The archives of Sheila Watson are currently preserved at the University of St. Michael's College at the University of Toronto. The collection contains Watson's journals, letters and photographs, as well as papers relating to her editorial work in White Pelican.
