= Wilfred Watson =

Canadian academic (1911–1998)

- Born: May 1, 1911; Rochester, England
- Died: March 25, 1998 (aged 86)
- Citizenship: (Canada) Canadian
- Occupation: Professor
- Spouse: Sheila Watson
- Writing career
- Language: English
- Notable awards: Governor General's Award

Wilfred Watson (May 1, 1911 – March 25, 1998) was professor emeritus of English at Canada's University of Alberta for many years. He was also an experimental Canadian poet and dramatist, whose innovative plays had a considerable influence in the 1960s. The Dictionary of Literary Biography (DLB) says that "Watson ushered in an avant-garde in Canadian theater years before the rear guard had fully emerged."

== Life and work ==
Wilfred Watson was born in Rochester, England in 1911, the oldest child of Louisa Claydon and Frederick Walter Watson. When he was 15 his family immigrated to Canada and settled in Duncan, British Columbia. He attended the University of British Columbia from 1940 to 1943 and received a B.A. in English literature. In 1941 he married Sheila Martin Doherty, who as Sheila Watson would write the novel The Double Hook.

On graduating, Watson enlisted in the Royal Canadian Navy for the balance of World War II. After the war he attended the University of Toronto, receiving his M.A. in 1946 and Ph.D. in 1951.

Wilfred Watson began his academic career in 1949 as a lecturer in English at the University of British Columbia. He taught at the University of Alberta in Calgary from 1951 to 1953. In 1954 he transferred to the Edmonton campus, where he remained as professor of English until retiring in 1977.

Watson lived in Paris in 1955 and 1956, as the recipient of a Canadian Government Overseas Fellowship. There he was introduced to the theatre of the absurd.

In 1961, Sheila Watson was also hired as a professor of English by the University of Alberta. "In Edmonton the Watsons became part of an active circle of writers and established the literary magazine,The White Pelican in 1970 along with Douglas Barbour, Stephen Scobie, John Orrell, Dorothy Livesay, and artist Norman Yates."

Other members of the Watsons' intellectual circle were actor-directors Gordon Peacock and Thomas Peacocke, both associated with the University of Alberta's Studio Theatre. The Studio Theatre became an important venue for the production of Wilfred Watson's plays, beginning with Cockcrow and the Gulls (which he'd written in the mid-1950s) in March 1962.

In the early 1960s Watson co-founded a jazz club, Yardbird Suite in Edmonton. During the same period he became acquainted with Marshall McLuhan and increasingly interested in McLuhan's theories, which resulted in the two men authoring a study, From Cliche to Archetype.

The 1960s were Watson's most prolific period for playwriting. Trial of Corporal Adam was produced in 1963; Wail for Two Pedestals in 1964; a centennial play, O Holy Ghost, Dip Your Finger in the Blood of Canada, and Write, I LOVE YOU in 1967; and the satire Let's Murder Clytemnestra According to the Principles of Marshall Mcluhan in 1969.

During the 1970s Watson returned to poetry, publishing The Sorrowful Canadians and Other Poems in 1972, I Begin with Counting in 1978, and Mass on Cowback in 1982. In 1983 he wrote a major dramatic work, the trilogy Gramsci x 3, which was produced by Studio Theatre in 1986. He also had a short play, The Woman Taken in Adultery, performed at the Edmonton Fringe Festival in 1987.

Wilfred Watson retired in 1977 and moved in 1980 to Nanaimo, British Columbia with his wife Sheila. He died there in 1998 at the age of 87.

== Writing ==
Watson's first book of poetry, Friday's Child, was accepted by T.S. Eliot and published in 1955 by Faber and Faber. On its appearance, Canadian critic Northrop Frye called it "typically formal poetry, mythical, metaphorical and apocalyptic." Frye was admiring: "We feel that even a line as breath-taking as 'When in her side my eyes were but blind seeds,' or a phrase like 'the tomb egg broken,' is merely what fits the poem at that point: brilliant as the imagery is, there is no costume jewellery."

In his second book, The Sorrowful Canadians and Other Poems, published in 1972, Watson experimented with using repetitions and different typefaces.

Watson introduced a unique form he called Number-grid Verse in his third book, 1978's I Begin With Counting. The form combines numerals and letters, using "a vertical grid of 9 numbers with 17 slots for words, syllables or phrases. By stacking the grids, Watson writes a "score" for the performance of multivoice poems which exist not on the page but in transformations from visual to auditory forms.".

Watson used Number-grid Verse in his next book of poetry, Mass on Cowback (1982). The form also allowed him to score poetry for oral performance by several voices, which he used in his later plays.

His trilogy Gramsci x 3 is part docudrama, part theatre of the absurd, "continual experimentation with verse forms, satire alternating with lyricism, and an energy and exaltation that transcends the horrors it depicts."

== Recognition ==
Watson's first book of poetry, Friday's Child, won both the British Council and Governor General's Awards for poetry in 1955.

== Publications ==
=== Plays ===
- Cockrow and the Gulls, 1962.
- The Trial of Corporal Adam, 1963.
- Wail for Two Pedestals, 1964.
- O Holy Ghost DIP YOUR FINGER IN THE BLOOD OF CANADA and write, I LOVE YOU, 1967.
- Let's murder Clytemnestra, according to the principles of Marshall McLuhan, 1969.
- Gramsci x 3. Edmonton, Longspoon, 1983.
- The Woman Taken in Adultery, 1987.
- Plays at the Iron Bridge, or, The autobiography of Tom Horror.

Shirley Neuman ed., Gordon Peacock intr. Edmonto: Longspoon/NeWest, 1989.

=== Poetry ===
- Friday's Child. London: Faber & Faber, 1955. New York: Farrar Straus & Cudahy, 1955.
- The Sorrowful Canadians and Other Poems. Edmonton: White Pelican, 1972.
- I Begin with Counting. Edmonton: NeWest, 1978.
- Mass on Cowback 1982.
- Poems: Collected, Unpublished, New. Thomas Peacocke intr. Edmonton: NeWEst, 1986.

=== Fiction ===
- The Baie Comeau Angel and Other Stories. Edmonton: NeWest, 1993.

=== Non-fiction ===
- Marshall McLuhan & Wilfred Watson. From Cliché to Archetype, 1970.

=== Fonds ===
Wilfred Watson's papers are located in the University of Alberta archives.

Except where noted, bibliographic information courtesy The Canadian Encyclopedia.
