= Global village =

Phrase coined by Marshall McLuhan

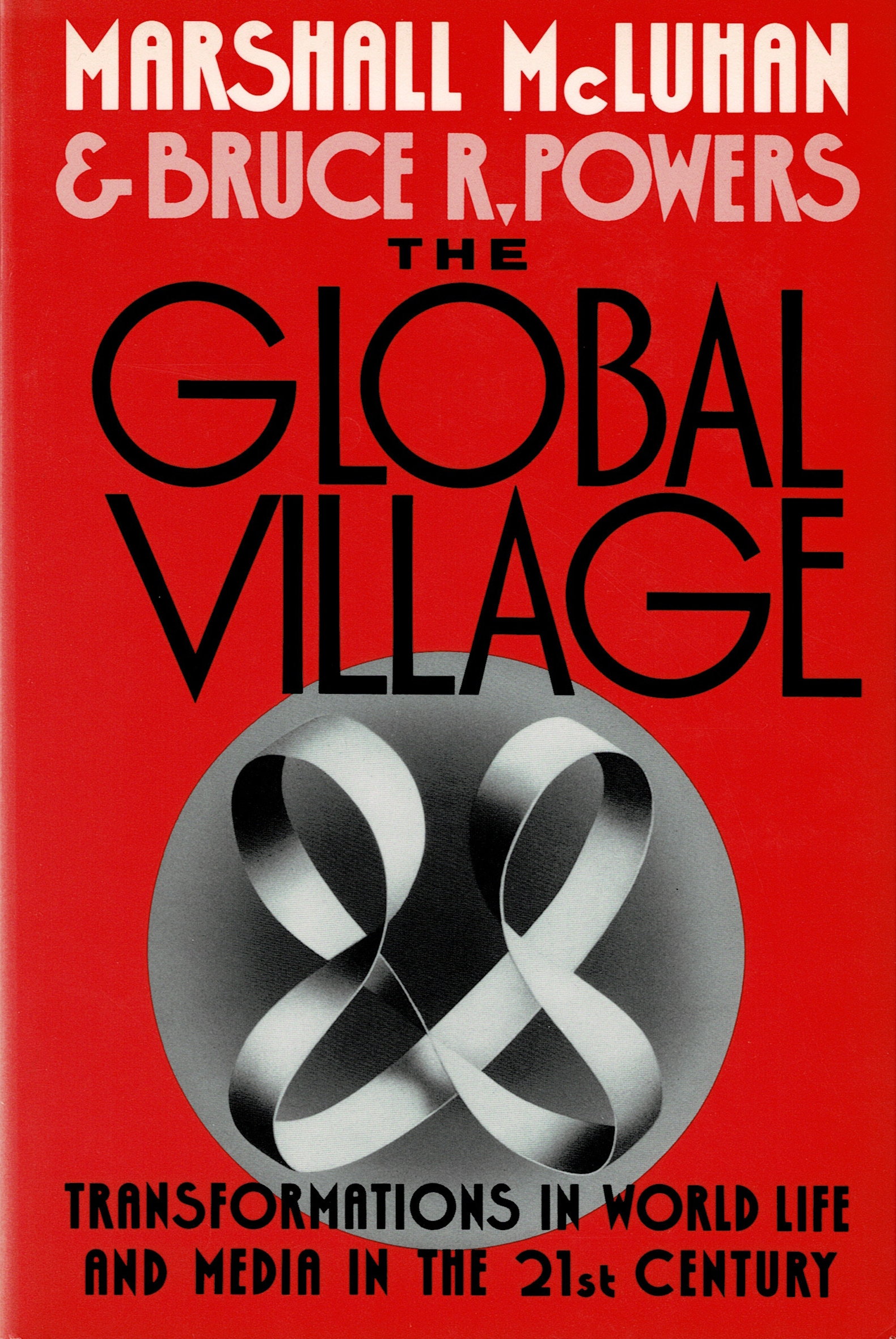
Cover of The Global Village: Transformations in World Life and Media in the 21st Century, published in 1989

Global village describes the phenomenon of the entire world becoming more interconnected as the result of the propagation of media technologies throughout the world. The term was coined by Canadian media theorist Marshall McLuhan in his books The Gutenberg Galaxy: The Making of Typographic Man (1962) and Understanding Media (1964), and the concept was expanded upon in The Global Village: Transformations in World Life and Media in the 21st Century (1989). Literary scholar Sue-Im Lee describes how the term global village has come to designate "the dominant term for expressing a global coexistence altered by transnational commerce, migration, and culture" (as cited in Poll, 2012). Economic journalist Thomas Friedman's definition of the global village as a world "tied together into a single globalized marketplace and village" is another contemporary understanding of the term (as cited in Poll, 2012).

== Overview ==
Marshall McLuhan, who was a Canadian thinker, coined the term "global village" in the 1960s. It encapsulates the daily production and consumption of media, images, and content by global audiences. McLuhan's views on the retribalization of Western society are prefigured in American anthropologist Edward Sapir's 1933 article on Communication, in which he wrote:

The multiplication of far-reaching techniques of communication has two important results. In the first place, it increases the sheer radius of communication, so that for certain purposes the whole civilized world is made the psychological equivalent of a primitive tribe.

McLuhan based his concept on the phenomenon of people moving toward worldwide personal interactions, and the consequences of this shift. The term "global village" means that all parts of the world are being brought together by the internet and other electronic communication interconnections. Video communication technology allows easier connection with others, including in other countries. The new reality of the digital age has implications for forming new socially culturally meaningful structures. For example, the increased velocity of transactions has fostered international density, making social networks a catalyst for social change.

Within the global village framework, individuals transcend the micro-, meso- and macro-dynamics of their life on a daily basis. Individuals tend to get involved in complex communities of networks stretching worldwide. The increasing density of electronically established and maintained human interconnections can form new socially significant clusters. The global village's implications on human relations are yet to be comprehensively studied primarily in terms of pattern recognition and discrimination techniques. Electronic media have the ability to impact individuals differently for various reasons, such as their religious and political beliefs. The time in which messages are received also affects how a message is understood.

The notion of the global village has significantly influenced perspectives on how media and technology shape human thought and culture. McLuhan's formulation of the concept remains influential in contemporary discussions of globalization and digital interconnectedness.

== Global village and media ==
People use technology to fit into a digital community to which they are not physically connected, but mentally connected. Each social media platform acts as a digital home for individuals, allowing people to express themselves through the global village. A Review of General Semantics argues that media ecology and new media have expanded who has the ability to create and view media texts. Since mass media emerged, it has called for the westernization of the world. Most developing countries acquire the news and entertainment from developed nations such as the UK, and the information received can be biased in favour of developed nations.

On the internet, physical distance is even less of a hindrance to the real-time communicative activities of people. Social spheres are greatly expanded by the openness of the web and the ease at which people can search for online communities and interact with others who share the same interests and concerns. According to Maria Ozawa and Shigeo Tokuda, the enhanced "electric speed in bringing all social and political functions together in a sudden implosion has heightened human awareness of responsibility to an intense degree." Increased speed of communication and the ability for people to read about, spread, and react to global news quickly enables individuals to become more involved with others from various social groups and countries around the world and to be more aware of our global responsibilities. Similarly, web-connected computers enable people to link their websites together.

Nathan Nash examined the relationship between McLuhan's concept of the global village and the rise of social networking platforms such as Facebook. He argued that while Facebook facilitates international connections and the appearance of global social ties, these links often remain shaped by geographic proximity, language, and cultural background. He suggests that social media illustrates some aspects of McLuhan's idea, but also points out that digital ties are frequently uneven and superficial. Similarly, Elissavet Georgiadou suggests that the internet generally aligns with many qualities of the global village, but argues that the realized global village is imperfect because the full inclusivity, equality, and cultural homogeneity that McLuhan may have hoped for have not been fully achieved.

== Global theater ==
McLuhan first compared new media to performance in 1970, when he began to replace the term "global village" with "global theater" to emphasize the participatory and performative dimensions of electronic media. Instead of just connecting people, electronic media such as radio and television turned cultural and political events into performances witnessed by a worldwide audience. After the Soviet Union launched Sputnik in 1957, McLuhan believed the globe became a "repertory theater to be programmed," emphasizing the rise of performance, surveillance, and programmable environments. This notion suggests that with electronic media and satellites, the boundaries between performers and audiences dissolve, and all individuals become participants in a worldwide drama.

Contemporary scholars have drawn parallels between McLuhan's "global theater" and modern social media platforms, highlighting how these platforms transform users into both performers and audiences within a global spectacle. For instance, Rashid Amar and Musa Khan explore how the Metaverse, as an immersive virtual reality environment, exemplifies McLuhan's notion of media as extensions of human capabilities, suggesting that such platforms facilitate a participatory and performative global stage.

== See also ==
- Global Village Coffeehouse
- Context collapse
- Globalization
- Information Revolution
- Internet metaphors
- Silk Road
- The Society of the Spectacle

== Sources ==
- Marshall McLuhan and Bruce R. Powers, The Global Village: Transformations in World Life and Media in the 21st Century, Oxford University Press, 1992.
