= Internet metaphors =

Aspect of Internet culture

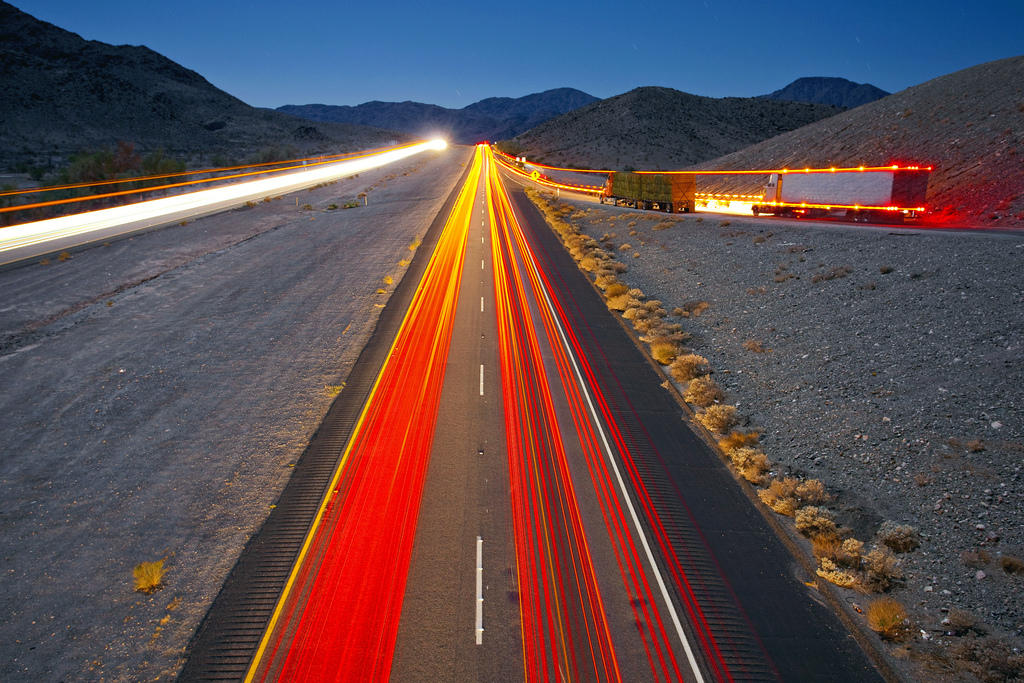
An earlier metaphor of the Internet was the information superhighway.

Internet metaphors provide users and researchers of the Internet a structure for understanding and communicating its various functions, uses, and experiences. An advantage of employing metaphors is that they permit individuals to visualize an abstract concept or phenomenon with which they have limited experience by comparing it with a concrete, well-understood concept such as physical movement through space. Metaphors to describe the Internet have been utilized since its creation and developed out of the need for the Internet to be understood by everyone when the goals and parameters of the Internet were still unclear. Metaphors helped to overcome the problems of the invisibility and intangibility of the Internet's infrastructure and to fill linguistic gaps where no literal expressions existed.

"Highways, webs, clouds, matrices, frontiers, railroads, tidal waves, libraries, shopping malls, and village squares are all examples of metaphors that have been used in discussions of the Internet." Over time these metaphors have become embedded in cultural communications, subconsciously shaping the cognitive frameworks and perceptions of users who guide the Internet's future development. Popular metaphors may also reflect the intentions of Internet designers or the views of government officials. Internet researchers tend to agree that popular metaphors should be re-examined often to determine if they accurately reflect the realities of the Internet, but many disagree on which metaphors are worth keeping and which ones should be left behind.

== Overview ==
Internet metaphors guide future action and perception of the Internet's capabilities on an individual and societal level. Internet metaphors are contestable and sometimes may present political, educational, and cognitive issues. Tensions between producer and user, commercial and non-commercial interests, and uncertainty regarding privacy all influence the shape these metaphors take.

Common Internet metaphors such as the information superhighway are often criticized for failing to adequately reflect the reality of the Internet as they emphasize the speed of information transmission over the communal and relationship building aspects of the Internet. Internet researchers from a variety of disciplines are engaged in the analysis of metaphors across many domains in order to reveal their impact on user perception and determine which metaphors are best suited for conceptualizing the Internet. Results of this research have become the focus of a popular debate on which metaphors should be applied in political, educational, and commercial settings as well as which aspects of the Internet remain unaccounted for with current metaphors, limiting the scope of users understanding.

Metaphors of the Internet often reveal the intentions of designers and industry spokespeople. "For instance, those who use metaphors of consumption and shopping malls will devote resources to developing secure exchange mechanisms. Broadcasting metaphors carry with them assumptions about the nature of interactions between audiences and content providers that are more passive than those suggested by interactive game metaphors and applications. Computer security experts deploy metaphors that invoke fear, anxiety, and apocalyptic threat" (Wyatt, 2004, p. 244). The extent to which the Internet is understood across individuals and groups determines their ability to navigate and build Web sites and social networks, attend online school, send e-mail, and a variety of other functions. Internet metaphors provide a comprehensive picture of the Internet as a whole as well as describe and explain the various tools, purposes, and protocols that regulate the use of these communication technologies.

Without the use of metaphors the concept of the Internet is abstract and its infrastructure difficult to comprehend. When it was introduced, the Internet created a linguistic gap as no literal expressions existed to define its functions and properties. Internet metaphors arose out of this predicament so that it could be adequately described and explained to the public. Essentially all language now used to communicate about the Internet is of a metaphorical nature, although users are often unaware of this reality because it is embedded in a cultural context that is widely accepted. There are several types of metaphors that serve various purposes and can range from describing the nature of online relationships, modeling the Internet visually, to the specific functions of the Internet as a tool. Each metaphor has implications for the experience and understanding of the Internet by its users and tends to emphasize some aspects of the Internet over others. Some metaphors emphasize space (Matlock, Castro, Fleming, Gann, & Maglio, 2014).

== Popular culture ==
Common recurring themes regarding the Internet appear in popular media and reflect pervasive cultural attitudes and perceptions. Although other models and constructed metaphors of the Internet found in scholarly research and theoretical frameworks may be more accurate sources on the effects of the Internet, mass media messages in popular culture are more likely to influence how people think about and interact with the Internet.

The very first metaphor to describe the Internet was the World Wide Web, proposed in 1989. However, uncertainty surrounding the structure and properties of the Internet was apparent in the newspapers of the 1990s that presented a vast array of contradicting visual models to explain the Internet. Spatial constructs were utilized to make the Internet appear as a tangible entity placed within a familiar geographical context. A popular metaphor adopted around the same time was cyberspace, coined by William Gibson in his novel Neuromancer to describe the world of computers and the society that gathers around them.

Howard Rheingold, an Internet enthusiast of the 1990s, propagated the metaphor of virtual communities and offered a vivid description of the Internet as "...a place for conversation or publication, like a giant coffee-house with a thousand rooms; it is also a world-wide digital version of the Speaker's Corner in London's Hyde Park, an unedited collection of letters to the editor, a floating flea market, a huge vanity publisher, and a collection of every odd-special interest group in the world" (Rheingold 1993, p. 130).

In 1991, Al Gore's choice to use the information superhighway as a metaphor shifted perceptions of the Internet as a communal enterprise to an economic model that emphasized the speed of information transmission. While this metaphor can still be found in popular culture, it has generally been dropped in favor of other metaphors due to its limited interpretation of other aspects of the Internet such as social networks. The most common types of metaphors in usage today relate to either social or functional aspects of the Internet or representations of its infrastructure through visual metaphors and models.

=== Social metaphors ===
Internet metaphors frequently arise from social exchanges and processes that occur online and incorporate common terms that describe offline social activities and realities. These metaphors often point to the fundamental elements that make up social interactions, even though online interactions differ in significant ways from face-to-face communication. Therefore, social metaphors tend to communicate more about the values of society rather than the technology of the Internet itself.

Metaphors such as the electronic neighborhood and virtual community point to ways in which individuals connect to others and build relationships by joining a social network. Global village is another metaphor that evokes the imagery of closeness and interconnectedness that might be found in a small village, but is applied to the worldwide community of Internet users. However, the global village metaphor has been criticized for suggesting that the entire world is connected by the Internet as the continued existence of social divides prevent many individuals from accessing the Internet.

The electronic frontier metaphor conceptualizes the Internet as a vast unexplored territory, a source of new resources, and a place to forge new social and business connections. Similar to the American ideology of the Western Frontier, the electronic frontier invokes the image of a better future to come through new opportunities afforded by the Internet. The Electronic Frontier Foundation is a non-profit digital rights group that adopted the use of this metaphor to denote their dedication to the protection of personal freedoms and fair use within the digital landscape. Social metaphors and their pervasive influence indicate the increasing importance placed on social interaction on the Internet.

=== Functional metaphors ===
Functional metaphors of the Internet shape our understanding of the medium itself and give us clues as to how we should actually use the Internet and interpret its infrastructure for design and policy making. These exist at the level of the Internet as a whole, at the level of a website, and the level of individual pages. The majority of these types of metaphors are based on the concept of various spaces and physical places; therefore, most are considered spatial metaphors. However, this aspect should not be considered the only defining feature of a functional metaphor as social metaphors are often spatial in nature.

Cyberspace is the most widely used spatial metaphor of the Internet and the implications of its use can be seen in the Oxford English Dictionary definition, which denotes cyberspace as a space within whose boundaries digital communications take place. The implications of this spatial metaphor in discourse on law can be seen in instances where the application of traditional laws governing real property are applied to Internet spaces. However, arguments against this type of ruling have claimed that the Internet is a borderless space, which should not be subject to the laws applied to places. Others have argued that the Internet is in fact a real space not sealed from the real world and can be zoned, trespassed upon, or divided up into holdings like real property.

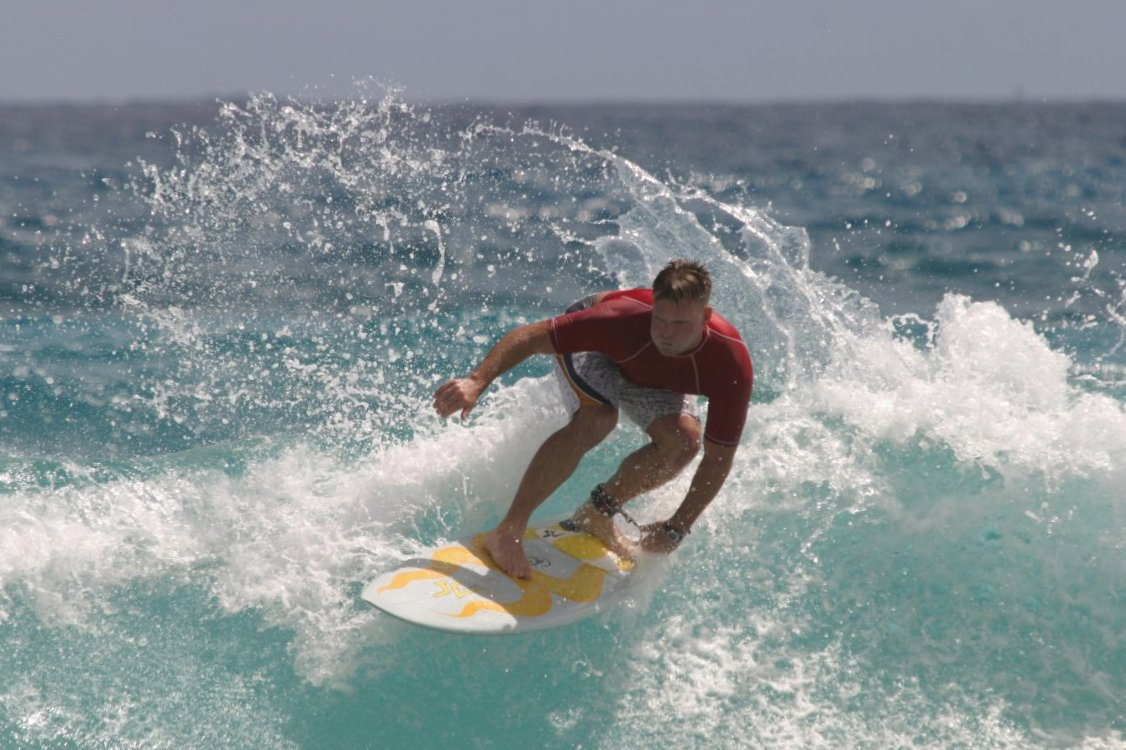
Surfing the 'Net' is a metaphor that uses the spatial domain of the ocean to suggest that navigating the Internet is similar to the flow of surfing.

Other functional metaphors are based on travel within space, such as surfing the Net, which suggests that the Internet is similar to an ocean. Mark McCahill coined 'surfing the internet' in an analogy with browsing a library shelf as an information space. Websites indicate components of a space, which are static and fixed, whereas webpages suggest pages of a book. Similarly, focal points of the Internet structure are called nodes. Home pages, chat rooms, windows, and the idea that one can jump from one page to the next also invoke spatial imagery that guide the functions that users perform on the Internet. Other metaphors refer to the Internet as another dimension beyond typical spaces, such as portals and gateways, which refer to access and communication functions. Firewalls invoke the image of physically blocking the incoming of information such as viruses and pop-up ads.

Designers of computer systems often use spatial metaphors as a way of controlling the complexity of interfaces. Designers create actions, procedures, and concepts of systems based on similar actions, procedures, and concepts of other domains such as physical spaces so that they will be familiar to users. In designing hypertext, a system that links topics on a screen to related information, navigational metaphors such as landmarks, routes, and way-finding have often been implemented for users' ease of understanding how hypertext functions.

=== Visual metaphors ===
Visual metaphors are popular in conceptualizing the Internet and are often deployed in commercial promotions through visual media and imagery. The most common visual metaphor is a network of wires with nodes and route lines plotted on a geographically based map. However, maps of Internet infrastructure produced for network marketing are rarely based on actual pathways of wires and cable on the ground, but are instead based on circuit diagrams similar to those seen on subway maps. The globe, or the Earth viewed from space, with network arcs of data flow wrapped around it, is another dominant metaphor for the Internet in Western contexts and is connected with the metaphor of the global village. Many abstract visual metaphors based on organic structures and patterns are found in literature on the Internet's infrastructure. Often, these metaphors are used as a visual shorthand in explanations as they allow one to refer to the Internet as a definite object without having to explain the intricate details of its functioning. Clouds are the most common of abstract metaphors employed for this purpose in cloud computing and have been used since the creation of the Internet. Other abstract metaphors of the Internet draw on the fractal branching of trees and leaves, and the lattices of coral and webs, while others are based on the aesthetics of astronomy such as gas nebulas, and star clusters.

Technical methods such as algorithms are often used to create huge, complex graphs or maps of raw data from networks and the topology of connections. The typical result of this process are visual representations of the Internet that are elaborate and visually striking, resembling organic structures. These artistic, abstract representations of the Internet have been featured in art galleries, sold as wall posters, used on book covers, and have been claimed to be a picture of the whole Internet by many fans. However, there are no instructions on how these images may be interpreted. The main function of these representations has sometimes been explained as a metaphor for the complexity of the Internet.

== See also ==
- Series of tubes
