= The Double Hook =

1959 novel by Sheila Watson

- First edition
- Author: Sheila Watson
- Cover artist: Frank Newfeld
- Language: English
- Series: New Canadian Library
- Genre: modernist
- Publisher: McClelland & Stewart
- Publication date: 1959
- Publication place: Canada
- Media type: Hardcover & paperback
- Pages: 127
- Dewey Decimal: C813.54
- LC Class: PR9199.3 W37 D68

The Double Hook is a novel written by Sheila Watson, which is considered "a seminal work in the development of contemporary Canadian literature." Published in 1959, The Double Hook is written in a style more like prose poetry than fiction. It is often considered to be Canada's first modernist novel due to how it "departs from traditional plot, character development, form and style to tell a poetic tale of human suffering and redemption that is at once fabular, allegorical and symbolic." The Canadian Encyclopedia declares that: "Publication of Watson's novel The Double Hook (1959) marks the start of contemporary writing in Canada."

Watson said that her novel is "about how people are driven, how if they have no art, how if they have no tradition, how if they have no ritual, they are driven in one of two ways, either towards violence or towards insensibility – if they have no mediating rituals which manifest themselves in what I suppose we call art forms." She has explained that the "double hook" of her title refers to the idea "that when you fish for the glory you catch the darkness too. That if you hook twice the glory you hook twice the fear."

== History ==
Watson wrote The Double Hook between 1952 and 1954 in Calgary, Alberta and revised it during a year spent in Paris. Throughout the 1950s she was unable to find a publisher. "T.S. Eliot at Faber & Faber, C. Day-Lewis at Chatto & Windus, and Rupert Hart-Davis all turned it down."

McClelland & Stewart optioned the book in Canada, largely on the strength of a covering letter by Fred Salter of the University of Alberta calling it "the most brilliant piece of fiction ever written in Canada." To decide on publication, though, the company sought the opinion of its modernist poet, Earle Birney. Birney found The Double Hook "monotonous, self-conscious, artificial, and lacking in real fictional interest", and admitted that "I just don’t know what the damned novel is about." He did say that the novel's "poetic-cryptic style" made it "certainly a remarkable piece of writing", but ultimately advised against publication.

McClelland & Stewart were also unable to interest an American publisher in simultaneous publication. "Harcourt-Brace, Knopf, Atheneum, Random House, and New Directions agreed that although The Double Hook was not without merit, they were not interested in losing money on it." Alfred Knopf Sr. wrote to Jack McClelland that ""I'm afraid we simply can't go along with Professor Salter in the matter of Sheila Watson's The Double Hook. We don't feel it could conceivably sell, and it doesn't seem to us to be anything like distinguished enough to justify Salter's hoop'la."

In 1959 The Double Hook was published, and instantly recognized as a modern classic. "All 3,000 copies of the initial print run were sold. Supporters such as Marshall McLuhan, as well as Yale formalist Cleanth Brooks, saw it as a literary landmark ushering the Canadian novel out of its regional confines."

The Canadian Broadcasting Corporation later approached Watson to option the film rights to The Double Hook. However, because they would not give her veto rights over the script, she turned them down.

The novel has remained in print continuously since 1959, as part of McClelland & Stewart's New Canadian Library. It has also been published in Swedish as Dubbelkroken in 1963 (translated by Artur Lundkvist), in French as Sous l'oeil de coyote in 1976 (translated by Arlette Francière), and in Italian as Il doppio amo in 1992.

=== Deep Hollow Creek ===
In 1992 the New Canadian Library published another novel, Deep Hollow Creek, which Watson had written in the 1930s. "Deep Hollow Creek treats many of the same themes" as The Double Hook "in a manner which is more direct and conventional, but no less elliptical and challenging."

== Plot and characters ==
"The Double Hook presents in concise, symbolic terms a drama of social disintegration and redemption, set in an isolated BC community.... These themes are presented in a style which itself balances on a 'double hook': it is simultaneously local and universal, realistic and symbolic." "Watson weaves Christian myth, native legend and natural symbol into a profound prose poem."

The Double Hook takes place in a small, rural Canadian community. Although compared to the Biblical city of Nineveh, the community is not specifically named. The main characters are James, his sister Greta, and his brother William. Their deceased mother is simply called The Old Lady and plays a near-mythical role in the novel. Other characters include Felix and Angel who are married with unnamed children; Ara who is married to James' brother, William; Heinrich (also called The Boy), Lenchen, and their mother, Widow Wagner. There are two other minor characters, Theophil and Kip.

The novel opens with James killing the Old Lady. "When James Potter kills his mother in the opening scene, he sets in motion the Potter family's struggle against fear - symbolized most dramatically by the figure of Coyote - and with various forms of withdrawal from community into isolation." Within the context of Nineveh, though, his matricide is considered a good act as it is The Old Lady who creates negative energy in the community.

The Old Lady fishes on everyone's property, yet this act of fishing is negative and symbolic of death. The Old Lady has no use for the fish, she simply continually kills them without using them for nourishment. This act can be seen as a Christian parable: as The Old Lady kills fish she can be viewed as the Anti-Christ, since Jesus used one fish to feed a whole town. The idea of the fisher in the damaged land also unavoidably recalls the Arthurian legends of the Fisher King.

Despite the fact that The Old Lady is dead, she is seen throughout the novel on the properties of Felix and the Wagners, which perpetuates her inhuman qualities.

James Potter's "return to his isolated community in the Rockies after first fleeing to town represents the rebirth of hope and the confrontation with fear which might knit the Potters into a human community."

== Bibliography ==
- The Double Hook. Toronto: McClelland & Stewart, New Canadian Library, 1959. (1989 edition: ISBN 0-7710-9998-3)
- Dubbelkroken (Swedish trans. by Artur Lundkvist), 1963.
- Sous l'oeil de coyote. (French trans. by Arlette Francière). Montreal: Editions La Presse, 1976.
- Il doppio amo (Italian trans.), 1992.
- Deep Hollow Creek. Toronto: McClelland & Stewart, New Canadian Library, 1992. ISBN 0-7710-8823-X (1999 edition: ISBN 0-7710-3466-0)

=== Criticism ===
- Diane Bessai and David Jackel, eds. Figures in a Ground: Canadian Essays on Modern Literature Collected in Honor of Sheila Watson. Saskatoon: Western Producer Prairie Books, 1978.
- Scobie, Stephen. Sheila Watson. Toronto: ECW Press, 1985.
- Bowering, George. Ed. Sheila Watson and the Double Hook. Kempville, Ontario: Golden Dog Press, 1985.
- Bowering, Angela. Figures Cut in Sacred Ground: Illuminati in The Double Hook. Edmonton, Alberta: NeWest Press, 1988.
- Lovesey, Oliver. "The Place of the Journey in Randolph Stow's To The Islands and Sheila Watson's The Double Hook." Ariel 27.3 (July 1996).
