= Marshall McLuhan =

Canadian philosopher and communications scholar (1911–1980)

Marshall McLuhan CC
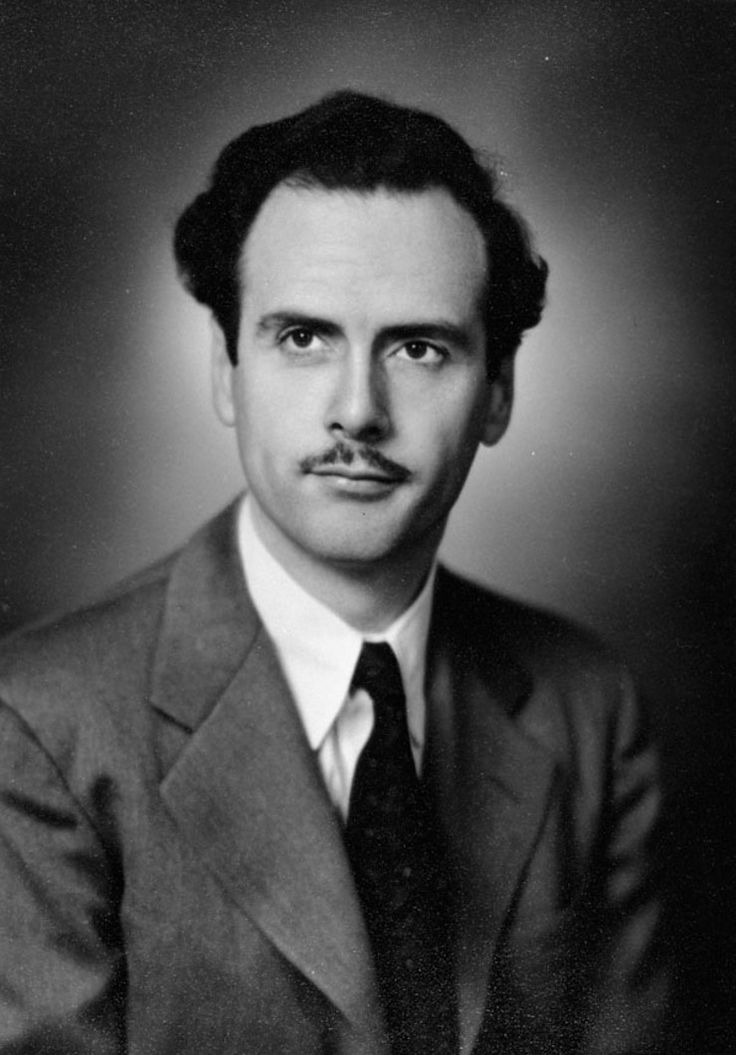
- McLuhan in 1945
- Born: Herbert Marshall McLuhan; July 21, 1911; Edmonton, Alberta, Canada
- Died: December 31, 1980 (aged 69); Toronto, Ontario, Canada
- Resting place: Holy Cross Catholic Cemetery, Thornhill
- Spouse: Corinne Lewis (m. 1939)
- Children: 6, including Eric

Academic background
- Education: University of Manitoba (BA, MA); Trinity Hall, Cambridge (PhD)
- Doctoral advisor: M. C. Bradbrook
- Influences: Thomas Aquinas; Aristotle; Francis Bacon; Hilaire Belloc; Pierre Teilhard de Chardin; Bonaventure; E. A. Bott; Bertram Brooker; Richard Maurice Bucke; Edmund Snow Carpenter; G. K. Chesterton; Marcel Duchamp; Jacques Ellul; Reginald Fessenden; John Murray Gibbon; Étienne Gilson; Eric A. Havelock; Harold Innis; James Joyce; F. R. Leavis; Wyndham Lewis; Thomas Nashe; I. A. Richards; Hans Selye

Academic work
- Discipline: Philosophy
- School or tradition: Toronto school of communication theory
- Institutions: St. Michael's College, Toronto
- Doctoral students: Sheila Watson
- Notable students: Walter J. Ong Hugh Kenner
- Main interests: Media; mass media; sensorium; New Criticism
- Notable ideas: The medium is the message; global village; figure and ground; tetrad of media effects; hot and cool media; media ecology; post-literate society
- Influenced: Jean Baudrillard; Norbert Bolz; John Cage; Douglas Coupland; Merce Cunningham; Jacques Derrida; Mark Fisher Buckminster Fuller; Dick Higgins; Abbie Hoffman; Hugh Kenner; Jacques Languirand; Timothy Leary; Paul Levinson; Terence McKenna; Ann Nocenti; Walter J. Ong; Neil Postman; B. W. Powe; Douglas Rushkoff; Gerd Stern; Nelson Thall; William Irwin Thompson; Alexander Bard
- Website: marshallmcluhan.com

Herbert Marshall McLuhan (/məˈkluːən/, mə-KLOO-ən; July 21, 1911 – December 31, 1980) was a Canadian philosopher whose work is among the cornerstones of the study of media theory. Raised in Winnipeg, McLuhan studied at the University of Manitoba and the University of Cambridge. He began his teaching career as a professor of English at several universities in the United States and Canada before moving to the University of Toronto in 1946, where he remained for the rest of his life. He is known as "the father of media studies".

McLuhan coined the expression "the medium is the message" (in the first chapter of his Understanding Media: The Extensions of Man), as well as the term global village. He predicted the World Wide Web almost 30 years before it was invented. He was a fixture in media discourse in the late 1960s, though his influence began to wane in the early 1970s. In the years following his death, he continued to be a controversial figure in academic circles. However, with the arrival of the Internet and the World Wide Web, interest was renewed in his work and perspectives.

== Life and career ==
McLuhan was born on July 21, 1911, in Edmonton, Alberta, and was named "Marshall" from his maternal grandmother's surname. His brother, Maurice, was born two years later. His parents were both also born in Canada: his mother, Elsie Naomi (née Hall), was a Baptist school teacher who later became an actress; and his father, Herbert Ernest McLuhan, was a Methodist with a real-estate business in Edmonton. When the business failed at the start of World War I, McLuhan's father enlisted in the Canadian Army. After a year of service, he contracted influenza and remained in Canada, away from the front lines. After Herbert's discharge from the army in 1915, the McLuhan family moved to Winnipeg, Manitoba, where Marshall grew up and went to school, attending Kelvin Technical School before enrolling in the University of Manitoba in 1928.

=== Undergraduate education ===
After studying for one year as an engineering student in Winnipeg, McLuhan changed majors and earned a Bachelor of Arts degree (1933), winning a University Gold Medal in Arts and Sciences. He went on to receive a Master of Arts degree (1934) in English from the University of Manitoba as well. He had long desired to pursue graduate studies in England and was accepted by Trinity Hall, Cambridge, having failed to secure a Rhodes Scholarship to study at Oxford.

Though having already earned his BA and MA in Manitoba, Cambridge required him to enroll as an undergraduate "affiliated" student, with one year's credit towards a three-year bachelor's degree, before entering any doctoral studies. (Note: McLuhan later commented "One advantage we Westerners have is that we're under no illusion we've had an education. That's why I started at the bottom again.") He went up to Cambridge in the autumn of 1934, studied under I. A. Richards and F. R. Leavis, and was influenced by New Criticism. Years afterward, upon reflection, he credited the faculty there with influencing the direction of his later work because of their emphasis on the "training of perception", as well as such concepts as Richards' notion of "feedforward". These studies formed an important precursor to his later ideas on technological forms. He received the required bachelor's degree from Cambridge in 1936 and entered their graduate program.

=== Conversion to Catholicism ===
At the University of Manitoba, McLuhan explored his conflicted relationship with religion and turned to literature to "gratify his soul's hunger for truth and beauty," later referring to this stage as agnosticism. While studying the trivium at Cambridge, he took the first steps toward his eventual conversion to Catholicism in 1937, founded on his reading of G. K. Chesterton. In 1935, he wrote to his mother:

Had I not encountered Chesterton I would have remained agnostic for many years at least. Chesterton did not convince me of religious faith, but he prevented my despair from becoming a habit or hardening into misanthropy. He opened my eyes to European culture and encouraged me to know it more closely. He taught me the reasons for all that in me was simply blind anger and misery.

At the end of March 1937, (Note: Gordon 1997, p. 74, gives the date as March 25; Marchand (1990), p.44, gives it as March 30.) McLuhan completed what was a slow but total conversion process, when he was formally received into the Catholic Church. After consulting a minister, his father accepted the decision to convert. His mother, however, felt that his conversion would hurt his career and was inconsolable. McLuhan was devout throughout his life, but his religion remained a private matter. In his personal correspondence and private writings, he sometimes made connections between his religion and the media: for example, he compared satellite technology to the Star of Bethlehem. He had a lifelong interest in the number three (e.g., the trivium, the Trinity) and sometimes said that the Virgin Mary provided intellectual guidance for him. (Note: Associates speculated about his intellectual connection to the Virgin Mary, one saying, "He had a direct connection with the Blessed Virgin Mary. ... He alluded to it very briefly once, almost fearfully, in a please-don't-laugh-at-me tone. He didn't say, 'I know this because the Blessed Virgin Mary told me,' but it was clear from what he said that one of the reasons he was so sure about certain things was that the Virgin had certified his understanding of them.")

=== Early career, marriage, and doctorate ===
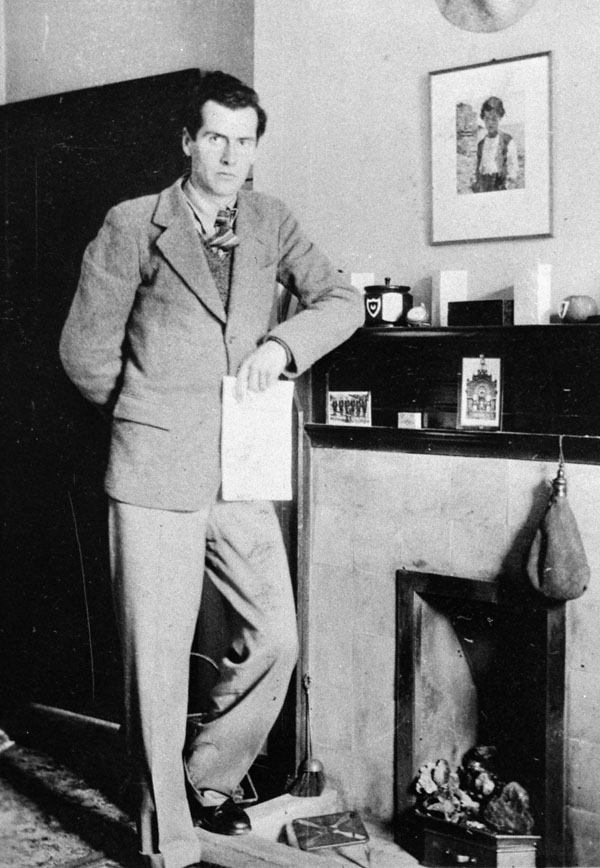
McLuhan at Cambridge, c. 1940

Unable to find a suitable job in Canada, he went to the United States to take a job as a teaching assistant at the University of Wisconsin–Madison for the 1936–1937 academic year. From 1937 to 1944, he taught English at Saint Louis University (with an interruption from 1939 to 1940 when he returned to Cambridge). There he taught courses on Shakespeare, eventually tutoring and befriending Walter J. Ong, who would write his doctoral dissertation on a topic that McLuhan had called to his attention, as well as become a well-known authority on communication and technology.

McLuhan met Corinne Lewis in St. Louis, a teacher and aspiring actress from Fort Worth, Texas, whom he married on August 4, 1939. They spent 1939–1940 in Cambridge, where he completed his master's degree (awarded in January 1940) and began to work on his doctoral dissertation on Thomas Nashe and the verbal arts. While the McLuhans were in England, World War II had erupted in Europe. For this reason, he obtained permission to complete and submit his dissertation from the United States, without having to return to Cambridge for an oral defence. In 1940, the McLuhans returned to Saint Louis University, where they started a family as he continued teaching. He was awarded a Doctor of Philosophy degree in December 1943.

He next taught at Assumption College in Windsor, Ontario, from 1944 to 1946, then moved to Toronto in 1946 where he joined the faculty of St. Michael's College, a Catholic college of the University of Toronto, where Hugh Kenner would be one of his students. Canadian economist and communications scholar Harold Innis was a university colleague who had a strong influence on his work. McLuhan wrote in 1964: "I am pleased to think of my own book The Gutenberg Galaxy as a footnote to the observations of Innis on the subject of the psychic and social consequences, first of writing then of printing." Tom Cooper's Wisdom Weavers: The Lives and Thought of Harold Innis and Marshall McLuhan explores the relationship of Innis and McLuhan in depth.

=== Later career and reputation ===
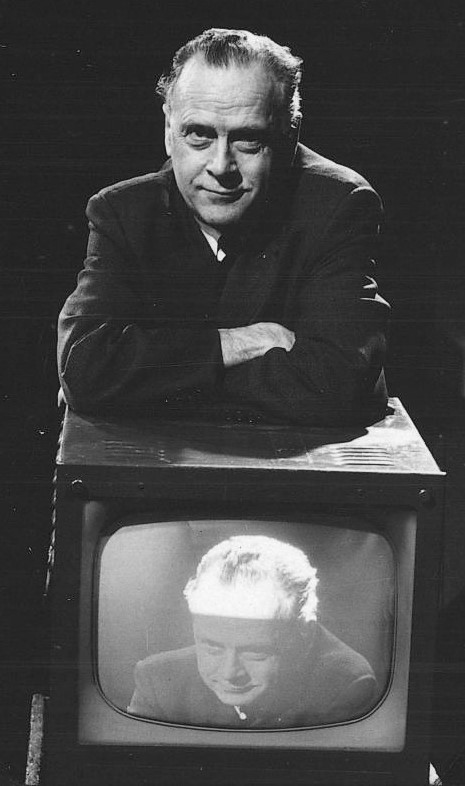
McLuhan with a television showing his own image, 1967

In the early 1950s, McLuhan began the Communication and Culture seminars at the University of Toronto, funded by the Ford Foundation. As his reputation grew, he received a growing number of offers from other universities. During this period, he published his first major work, The Mechanical Bride (1951), in which he examines the effect of advertising on society and culture. Throughout the 1950s, he and Edmund Carpenter also produced an important academic journal called Explorations. McLuhan and Carpenter have been characterized as the Toronto School of communication theory, together with Harold Innis, Eric A. Havelock, and Northrop Frye. During this time, McLuhan supervised the doctoral thesis of modernist writer Sheila Watson on the subject of Wyndham Lewis. Hoping to keep him from moving to another institute, the University of Toronto created the Centre for Culture and Technology (CCT) in 1963.

From 1967 to 1968, McLuhan was named the Albert Schweitzer Chair in Humanities at Fordham University in the Bronx. (Note: During the time at Fordham University, his son Eric McLuhan conducted what came to be known as the Fordham Experiment about the different effects of "light-on" versus "light-through" media.) While at Fordham, he was diagnosed with a benign brain tumour, which was treated successfully. He returned to Toronto where he taught at the University of Toronto for the rest of his life and lived in Wychwood Park, a bucolic enclave on a hill overlooking the downtown where Anatol Rapoport was his neighbour.

In 1970, he was made a Companion of the Order of Canada. In 1975, the University of Dallas hosted him from April to May, appointing him to the McDermott Chair. Marshall and Corinne McLuhan had six children: Eric, twins Mary and Teresa, Stephanie, Elizabeth, and Michael. The associated costs of a large family eventually drove him to advertising work and accepting frequent consulting and speaking engagements for large corporations, including IBM and AT&T.

=== Death ===
In September 1979, McLuhan suffered a stroke which affected his ability to speak. The University of Toronto's School of Graduate Studies tried to close his research centre shortly thereafter, but was deterred by substantial protests. McLuhan never fully recovered from the stroke and died in his sleep on December 31, 1980. He is buried at Holy Cross Catholic Cemetery, Thornhill, Ontario.

== Early works and influences ==
During his years at Saint Louis University (1937–1944), McLuhan worked concurrently on two projects: his doctoral dissertation and the manuscript that was eventually published in 1951 as a book, titled The Mechanical Bride: Folklore of Industrial Man, which included only a representative selection of the materials that McLuhan had prepared for it.

McLuhan's 1942 Cambridge University doctoral dissertation surveys the history of the verbal arts (grammar, logic, and rhetoric—collectively known as the trivium) from the time of Cicero down to the time of Thomas Nashe. (Note: McLuhan's doctoral dissertation from 1942 was published by Gingko Press in March 2006. Gingko Press also plans to publish the complete manuscript of items and essays that McLuhan prepared, only a selection of which were published in his book. With the publication of these two books a more complete picture of McLuhan's arguments and aims is likely to emerge.) In his later publications, McLuhan at times uses the Latin concept of the trivium to outline an orderly and systematic picture of certain periods in the history of Western culture. McLuhan suggests that the Late Middle Ages, for instance, were characterized by the heavy emphasis on the formal study of logic. The key development that led to the Renaissance was not the rediscovery of ancient texts, but a shift in emphasis from the formal study of logic to rhetoric and grammar. Modern life is characterized by the re-emergence of grammar as its most salient feature—a trend McLuhan felt was exemplified by the New Criticism of Richards and Leavis. (Note: For a nuanced account of McLuhan's thought regarding Richards and Leavis, see M. McLuhan 1944.)

McLuhan also began the academic journal Explorations with anthropologist Edmund "Ted" Carpenter. In a letter to Walter Ong, dated 31 May 1953, McLuhan reports that he had received a two-year grant of $43,000 from the Ford Foundation to carry out a communication project at the University of Toronto involving faculty from different disciplines, which led to the creation of the journal.

In 1999, Tom Wolfe suggested that a major under-acknowledged influence on McLuhan's work is the Jesuit philosopher Pierre Teilhard de Chardin, whose ideas anticipated those of McLuhan, especially the evolution of the human mind into the "noosphere." In his early book The Gutenberg Galaxy, however, McLuhan warns against whole-heartedly accepting or outright dismissing Teilhard's observations.

This externalization of our senses creates what de Chardin [sic] calls the "noosphere" or a technological brain for the world. Instead of tending towards a vast Alexandrian library the world has become a computer, an electronic brain, exactly as in an infantile piece of science fiction. And as our senses have gone outside us, Big Brother goes inside. So, unless aware of this dynamic, we shall at once move into a phase of panic terrors, exactly befitting a small world of tribal drums, total interdependence, and super-imposed co-existence.

In his private life, McLuhan wrote to friends saying: "I am not a fan of Pierre Teilhard de Chardin. The idea that anything is better because it comes later is surely borrowed from pre-electronic technologies." Further, McLuhan noted to a Catholic collaborator: "The idea of a Cosmic thrust in one direction ... is surely one of the lamest semantic fallacies ever bred by the word 'evolution'.… That development should have any direction at all is inconceivable except to the highly literate community."

Some of McLuhan's main ideas were influenced or prefigured by anthropologists like Edward Sapir and Claude Lévi-Strauss, arguably with a more complex historical and psychological analysis. The idea of the retribalization of Western society by the far-reaching techniques of communication, the view on the function of the artist in society, and the characterization of means of transportation, like the railroad and the airplane, as means of communication, are prefigured in Sapir's 1933 article on Communication in the Encyclopaedia of the Social Sciences, while the distinction between "hot" and "cool" media draws from Lévi-Strauss' distinction between hot and cold societies.

== Major works ==
=== The Mechanical Bride (1951) ===
McLuhan's first book, The Mechanical Bride: Folklore of Industrial Man (1951), is a pioneering study in the field now known as popular culture. In the book, McLuhan turns his attention to analysing and commenting on numerous examples of persuasion in contemporary popular culture. This followed naturally from his earlier work as both dialectic and rhetoric in the classical trivium aimed at persuasion. At this point, his focus shifted dramatically, turning inward to study the influence of communication media independent of their content. His famous aphorism "the medium is the message" (elaborated in his Understanding Media: The Extensions of Man, 1964) calls attention to this intrinsic effect of communications media. (Note: The phrase "the medium is the message" may be better understood in light of Bernard Lonergan's further articulation of related ideas: at the empirical level of consciousness, the medium is the message, whereas at the intelligent and rational levels of consciousness, the content is the message. This sentence uses Lonergan's terminology from Insight: A Study of Human Understanding to clarify the meaning of McLuhan's statement that "the medium is the message"; McLuhan read this when it was first published in 1957 and found "much sense" in it—in his letter of September 21, 1957, to his former student and friend, Walter J. Ong, McLuhan says, "Find much sense in Bern. Lonergan's Insight". Lonergan's Insight is an extended guide to "making the inward turn": attending ever more carefully to one's own consciousness, reflecting on it ever more carefully, and monitoring one's articulations ever more carefully. When McLuhan declares that he is more interested in percepts than concepts, he is declaring in effect that he is more interested in what Lonergan refers to as the empirical level of consciousness than in what Lonergan refers to as the intelligent level of consciousness in which concepts are formed, which Lonergan distinguishes from the rational level of consciousness in which the adequacy of concepts and of predications is adjudicated. This inward turn to attending to percepts and to the cultural conditioning of the empirical level of consciousness through the effect of communication media sets him apart from more outward-oriented studies of sociological influences and the outward presentation of self carried out by George Herbert Mead, Erving Goffman, Berger and Luckmann, Kenneth Burke, Hugh Duncan, and others.)

His interest in the critical study of popular culture was influenced by the 1933 book Culture and Environment by F. R. Leavis and Denys Thompson, and the title The Mechanical Bride is derived from a piece by the Dadaist artist Marcel Duchamp.

The Mechanical Bride is composed of 59 short essays that may be read in any order—what he styled the "mosaic approach" to writing a book. Each essay begins with a newspaper or magazine article, or an advertisement, followed by McLuhan's analysis thereof. The analyses bear on aesthetic considerations as well as on the implications behind the imagery and text. McLuhan chose these ads and articles not only to draw attention to their symbolism, as well as their implications for the corporate entities who created and disseminated them, but also to mull over what such advertising implies about the wider society at which it is aimed. Roland Barthes's 1957 essay Mythologies, echoes McLuhan's Mechanical Bride, as a series of exhibits of popular mass culture (like advertisements, newspaper articles and photographs) that are analyzed in a semiological way.

=== The Gutenberg Galaxy (1962) ===
Written in 1961 and first published by University of Toronto Press, The Gutenberg Galaxy: The Making of Typographic Man (1962) is a pioneering study in the fields of oral culture, print culture, cultural studies, media ecology or media-adequacy.

Throughout the book, McLuhan makes efforts to reveal how communication technology (i.e., alphabetic writing, the printing press, and the electronic media) affects cognitive organization, which in turn has profound ramifications for social organization:

[I]f a new technology extends one or more of our senses outside us into the social world, then new ratios among all of our senses will occur in that particular culture. It is comparable to what happens when a new note is added to a melody. And when the sense ratios alter in any culture then what had appeared lucid before may suddenly become opaque, and what had been vague or opaque will become translucent.

==== Movable type ====
McLuhan's episodic history takes the reader from pre-alphabetic, tribal humankind to the electronic age. According to McLuhan, the invention of movable type greatly accelerated, intensified, and ultimately enabled cultural and cognitive changes that had already been taking place since the invention and implementation of the alphabet, by which McLuhan means phonemic orthography. (McLuhan is careful to distinguish the phonetic alphabet from logographic or logogramic writing systems, such as Egyptian hieroglyphs or ideograms.)

Print culture, ushered in by the advance in printing during the middle of the 15th century when the Gutenberg press was invented, brought about the cultural predominance of the visual over the aural/oral. Quoting (with approval) an observation on the nature of the printed word from William Ivins' Prints and Visual Communication, McLuhan remarks:

In this passage [Ivins] not only notes the ingraining of lineal, sequential habits, but, even more important, points out the visual homogenizing of experience of print culture, and the relegation of auditory and other sensuous complexity to the background.…

The technology and social effects of typography incline us to abstain from noting interplay and, as it were, "formal" causality, both in our inner and external lives. Print exists by virtue of the static separation of functions and fosters a mentality that gradually resists any but a separative and compartmentalizing or specialist outlook.

The main concept of McLuhan's argument (later elaborated upon in The Medium Is the Massage) is that new technologies (such as alphabets, printing presses, and even speech) exert a gravitational effect on cognition, which in turn, affects social organization: print technology changes our perceptual habits—"visual homogenizing of experience"—which in turn affects social interactions—"fosters a mentality that gradually resists all but a…specialist outlook". According to McLuhan, this advance of print technology contributed to and made possible most of the salient trends in the modern period in the Western world: individualism, democracy, Protestantism, capitalism, and nationalism. For McLuhan, these trends all reverberate with print technology's principle of "segmentation of actions and functions and principle of visual quantification."

==== Global village ====
In the early 1960s, McLuhan wrote that the visual, individualistic print culture would soon be brought to an end by what he called "electronic interdependence" wherein electronic media replaces visual culture with aural/oral culture. In this new age, humankind would move from individualism and fragmentation to a collective identity, with a "tribal base." McLuhan's coinage for this new social organization is the global village. (Note: Sometimes Wyndham Lewis's America and Cosmic Man (1948) and James Joyce's Finnegans Wake are credited as the source of the phrase, but neither used the words "global village" specifically as such. According to McLuhan's son Eric McLuhan, his father, a Wake scholar and a close friend to Lewis, likely discussed the concept with Lewis during their association, but there is no evidence that he got the idea or the phrasing from either; generally, McLuhan is credited as having coined the term.)

The term is sometimes described as having negative connotations in The Gutenberg Galaxy, but McLuhan was interested in exploring effects, not making value judgments:

Instead of tending towards a vast Alexandrian library the world has become a computer, an electronic brain, exactly as an infantile piece of science fiction. And as our senses have gone outside us, Big Brother goes inside. So, unless aware of this dynamic, we shall at once move into a phase of panic terrors, exactly befitting a small world of tribal drums, total interdependence, and superimposed co-existence.… Terror is the normal state of any oral society, for in it everything affects everything all the time.…

In our long striving to recover for the Western world a unity of sensibility and of thought and feeling we have no more been prepared to accept the tribal consequences of such unity than we were ready for the fragmentation of the human psyche by print culture.

Key to McLuhan's argument is the idea that technology has no per se moral bent—it is a tool that profoundly shapes an individual's and, by extension, a society's self-conception and realization:

Is it not obvious that there are always enough moral problems without also taking a moral stand on technological grounds?…

Print is the extreme phase of alphabet culture that detribalizes or decollectivizes man in the first instance. Print raises the visual features of alphabet to highest intensity of definition. Thus, print carries the individuating power of the phonetic alphabet much further than manuscript culture could ever do. Print is the technology of individualism. If men decided to modify this visual technology by an electric technology, individualism would also be modified. To raise a moral complaint about this is like cussing a buzz-saw for lopping off fingers. "But", someone says, "we didn't know it would happen." Yet even witlessness is not a moral issue. It is a problem, but not a moral problem; and it would be nice to clear away some of the moral fogs that surround our technologies. It would be good for morality.

The moral valence of technology's effects on cognition is, for McLuhan, a matter of perspective. For instance, McLuhan contrasts the considerable alarm and revulsion that the growing quantity of books aroused in the latter 17th century with the modern concern for the "end of the book." If there can be no universal moral sentence passed on technology, McLuhan believes that "there can only be disaster arising from unawareness of the causalities and effects inherent in our technologies".

Though the World Wide Web was invented almost 30 years after The Gutenberg Galaxy, and 10 years after his death, McLuhan prophesied the web technology seen today as early as 1962:

The next medium, whatever it is—it may be the extension of consciousness—will include television as its content, not as its environment, and will transform television into an art form. A computer as a research and communication instrument could enhance retrieval, obsolesce mass library organization, retrieve the individual's encyclopedic function and flip into a private line to speedily tailored data of a saleable kind.

Furthermore, McLuhan coined and certainly popularized the usage of the term surfing to refer to rapid, irregular, and multidirectional movement through a heterogeneous body of documents or knowledge, e.g., statements such as "Heidegger surf-boards along on the electronic wave as triumphantly as Descartes rode the mechanical wave." Paul Levinson's 1999 book Digital McLuhan explores the ways that McLuhan's work may be understood better through using the lens of the digital revolution.

McLuhan frequently quoted Walter Ong's Ramus, Method, and the Decay of Dialogue (1958), which evidently had prompted McLuhan to write The Gutenberg Galaxy. Ong wrote a highly favourable review of this new book in America. However, Ong later tempered his praise, by describing McLuhan's The Gutenberg Galaxy as "a racy survey, indifferent to some scholarly detail, but uniquely valuable in suggesting the sweep and depth of the cultural and psychological changes entailed in the passage from illiteracy to print and beyond." McLuhan himself said of the book, "I'm not concerned to get any kudos out of [The Gutenberg Galaxy]. It seems to me a book that somebody should have written a century ago. I wish somebody else had written it. It will be a useful prelude to the rewrite of Understanding Media [the 1960 NAEB report] that I'm doing now."

McLuhan's The Gutenberg Galaxy won Canada's highest literary award, the Governor-General's Award for Non-Fiction, in 1962. The chairman of the selection committee was McLuhan's colleague at the University of Toronto and oftentime intellectual sparring partner, Northrop Frye.

=== Understanding Media (1964) ===
McLuhan's best-known work, Understanding Media: The Extensions of Man (1964), is a seminal study in media theory. Dismayed by the way in which people approach and use new media such as television, McLuhan famously argues that in the modern world "we live mythically and integrally…but continue to think in the old, fragmented space and time patterns of the pre-electric age."

McLuhan proposes that media themselves, not the content they carry, should be the focus of study—popularly quoted as "the medium is the message". His insight is that a medium affects the society in which it plays a role not by the content it delivers, but by its own characteristics. McLuhan points to the light bulb as a clear demonstration of this. A light bulb does not have content in the way that a newspaper has articles, or a television has programs, but it is a medium that has a social effect; that is, a light bulb enables people to create spaces at night that would otherwise be enveloped by darkness. He describes the light bulb as a medium without any content. McLuhan writes, "a light bulb creates an environment by its mere presence." More controversially, he postulates that content has little effect on society—for example, whether television broadcasts children's shows or violent programming, its effect on society is identical. He notes that all media have characteristics that engage the viewer in different ways; for instance, a passage in a book can be reread at will, but a movie must be screened again in its entirety to study any part of it.

==== "Hot" and "cool" media ====
In the first part of Understanding Media, McLuhan writes that different media invite different degrees of participation on the part of a person who chooses to consume a medium. Using terminology derived from French anthropologist Claude Lévi-Strauss's distinction between hot and cold societies, McLuhan argues that a cool medium requires increased involvement due to decreased description, while a hot medium is the opposite, decreasing involvement and increasing description. In other words, a society that appears to be actively participating in streaming content but does not consider the tool's effects is not allowing an "extension of ourselves". A movie is thus said to be "high definition", demanding a viewer's attention, and a comic book "low definition", requiring much more conscious participation by the reader to extract value: "Any hot medium allows of less participation than a cool one, as a lecture makes for less participation than a seminar, and a book for less than a dialogue."

Some media, such as movies, are hot—that is, they enhance a single sense, in this case vision, in such a manner that a person does not need to exert much effort to perceive a detailed moving image. Hot media usually, but not always, provide complete involvement with considerable stimulus. In contrast, "cool" print may also occupy visual space, using visual senses, but require focus and comprehension to immerse readers. Hot media creation favour analytical precision, quantitative analysis and sequential ordering, as they are usually sequential, linear, and logical. They emphasize one sense (for example, of sight or sound) over the others. For this reason, hot media include film (especially silent films), radio, the lecture, and photography.

McLuhan contrasts hot media with cool—specifically, television [of the 1960s i.e. small black-and-white screens], which he claims requires more effort from the viewer to determine meaning; and comics, which, due to their minimal presentation of visual detail, require a high degree of effort to fill in details the cartoonist may have intended to portray. Cool media are usually, but not always, those that provide little involvement with substantial stimulus. They require more active participation on the part of the user, including the perception of abstract patterning and simultaneous comprehension of all parts. Therefore, in addition to television, cool media include seminars and cartoons. McLuhan describes the term cool media as emerging from jazz and popular music used, in this context, to mean "detached".

This appears to force media into binary categories, but McLuhan's hot and cool exist on a continuum: they are more correctly measured on a scale than as dichotomous terms.

==== Critiques of Understanding Media ====
Some theorists have attacked McLuhan's definition and treatment of the word "medium" for being too simplistic. Umberto Eco, for instance, contends that McLuhan's medium conflates channels, codes, and messages under the overarching term of the medium, confusing the vehicle, internal code, and content of a given message in his framework.

In Media Manifestos, Régis Debray also takes issue with McLuhan's envisioning of the medium. Like Eco, he is ill at ease with this reductionist approach, summarizing its ramifications as follows:

The list of objections could be and has been lengthened indefinitely: confusing technology itself with its use of the media makes of the media an abstract, undifferentiated force and produces its image in an imaginary "public" for mass consumption; the magical naivete of supposed causalities turns the media into a catch-all and contagious "mana"; apocalyptic millenarianism invents the figure of a homo mass-mediaticus without ties to historical and social context, and so on.

Furthermore, when Wired magazine interviewed him in 1995, Debray said he saw McLuhan "more as a poet than a historian, a master of intellectual collage rather than a systematic analyst.… McLuhan overemphasizes the technology behind cultural change at the expense of the usage that the messages and codes make of that technology."

Dwight Macdonald, in turn, reproached McLuhan for his focus on television and for his "aphoristic" prose style, which he believes leaves Understanding Media filled with "contradictions, non-sequiturs, facts that are distorted and facts that are not facts, exaggerations, and chronic rhetorical vagueness."

Brian Winston's Misunderstanding Media, published in 1986, chides McLuhan for what he sees as his technologically deterministic stances. Raymond Williams furthers this point of contention, claiming:

The work of McLuhan was a particular culmination of an aesthetic theory which became, negatively, a social theory ... It is an apparently sophisticated technological determinism which has the significant effect of indicating a social and cultural determinism.… For if the medium—whether print or television—is the cause, all other causes, all that men ordinarily see as history, are at once reduced to effects.

David Carr wrote that there has been a long line of "academics who have made a career out of deconstructing McLuhan’s effort to define the modern media ecosystem", whether it be due to what they see as McLuhan's ignorance of sociohistorical context or the style of his argument.

While some critics have taken issue with McLuhan's writing style and mode of argument, McLuhan himself urged readers to think of his work as "probes" or "mosaics" offering a toolkit approach to thinking about media. His eclectic writing style has also been praised for its postmodern sensibilities and suitability for virtual space.

=== The Medium Is the Massage (1967) ===
The Medium Is the Massage: An Inventory of Effects, published in 1967, was McLuhan's best seller, "eventually selling nearly a million copies worldwide." Initiated by Quentin Fiore, McLuhan adopted the term "massage" to denote the effect each medium has on the human sensorium, taking inventory of the "effects" of numerous media in terms of how they "massage" the sensorium. (Note: According to McLuhan biographer W. Terrence Gordon, by the time it appeared in 1967, McLuhan no doubt recognized that his original saying had become a cliché and welcomed the opportunity to throw it back on the compost heap of language to recycle and revitalize it. But the new title is more than McLuhan indulging his insatiable taste for puns, more than a clever fusion of self-mockery and self-rescue—the subtitle is 'An Inventory of Effects,' underscoring the lesson compressed into the original saying. However, the FAQ section on the website maintained by McLuhan's estate says that this interpretation is incomplete and makes its own leap of logic as to why McLuhan left it as is: Why is the title of the book The Medium Is the Massage and not The Medium is the Message? Actually, the title was a mistake. When the book came back from the typesetter's, it had on the cover "Massage" as it still does. The title was supposed to have read The Medium is the Message, but the typesetter had made an error. When McLuhan saw the typo he exclaimed, "Leave it alone! It's great, and right on target!" Now there are possible four readings for the last word of the title, all of them accurate: Message and Mess Age, Massage and Mass Age.)

Fiore, at the time a prominent graphic designer and communications consultant, set about composing the visual illustration of these effects which were compiled by Jerome Agel. Near the beginning of the book, Fiore adopted a pattern in which an image demonstrating a media effect was presented with a textual synopsis on the facing page. The reader experiences a repeated shifting of analytic registers—from "reading" typographic print to "scanning" photographic facsimiles—reinforcing McLuhan's overarching argument in this book: namely, that each medium produces a different "massage" or "effect" on the human sensorium.

In The Medium Is the Massage, McLuhan also rehashed the argument—which first appeared in the Prologue to 1962's The Gutenberg Galaxy—that all media are "extensions" of our human senses, bodies and minds.

Finally, McLuhan described key points of change in how man has viewed the world and how these views were changed by the adoption of new media. "The technique of invention was the discovery of the nineteenth [century]", brought on by the adoption of fixed points of view and perspective by typography, while "[t]he technique of the suspended judgment is the discovery of the twentieth century," brought on by the bard abilities of radio, movies and television.

The past went that-a-way. When faced with a totally new situation we tend always to attach ourselves to the objects, to the flavor of the most recent past. We look at the present through a rear-view mirror. We march backward into the future. Suburbia lives imaginatively in Bonanza-land.

An audio recording version of McLuhan's famous work was made by Columbia Records. The recording consists of a pastiche of statements made by McLuhan interrupted by other speakers, including people speaking in various phonations and falsettos, discordant sounds and 1960s incidental music in what could be considered a deliberate attempt to translate the disconnected images seen on TV into an audio format, resulting in the prevention of a connected stream of conscious thought. Various audio recording techniques and statements are used to illustrate the relationship between spoken, literary speech and the characteristics of electronic audio media. McLuhan biographer Philip Marchand called the recording "the 1967 equivalent of a McLuhan video."

"I wouldn't be seen dead with a living work of art."—'Old man' speaking "Drop this jiggery-pokery and talk straight turkey."—"Middle-aged man" speaking

=== War and Peace in the Global Village (1968) ===
In War and Peace in the Global Village, McLuhan used James Joyce's Finnegans Wake, an inspiration for this study of war throughout history, as an indicator as to how war may be conducted in the future.

Joyce's Wake is claimed to be a gigantic cryptogram that reveals a cyclic pattern for human history through its Ten Thunders. Each "thunder" below is a 100-character portmanteau of other words to create a statement McLuhan likens to an effect that each technology has on the society into which it is introduced. In order to glean the most understanding out of each, the reader must break the portmanteau into separate words (many of these themselves portmanteaus of words taken from multiple languages other than English) and speak them aloud for the spoken effect of each word. There is much dispute over what each portmanteau truly denotes.

McLuhan claims that the ten thunders in Wake represent different stages in the history of man:

- Thunder 1: Paleolithic to Neolithic. Speech. Split of East/West. From herding to harnessing animals.
- Thunder 2: Clothing as weaponry. Enclosure of private parts. First social aggression.
- Thunder 3: Specialism. Centralism via wheel, transport, cities: civil life.
- Thunder 4: Markets and truck gardens. Patterns of nature submitted to greed and power.
- Thunder 5: Printing. Distortion and translation of human patterns and postures and pastors.
- Thunder 6: Industrial Revolution. Extreme development of print process and individualism.
- Thunder 7: Tribal man again. All characters end up separate, private man. Return of choric.
- Thunder 8: Movies. Pop art, pop Kulch via tribal radio. Wedding of sight and sound.
- Thunder 9: Car and Plane. Both centralizing and decentralizing at once create cities in crisis. Speed and death.
- Thunder 10: Television. Back to tribal involvement in tribal mood-mud. The last thunder is a turbulent, muddy wake, and murk of non-visual, tactile man.

=== From Cliché to Archetype (1970) ===
Collaborating with Canadian poet Wilfred Watson in From Cliché to Archetype (1970), McLuhan approaches the various implications of the verbal cliché and of the archetype. One major facet in McLuhan's overall framework introduced in this book that is seldom noticed is the provision of a new term that actually succeeds the global village: the global theatre.

In McLuhan's terms, a cliché is a "normal" action, phrase, etc. which becomes so often used that we are "anesthetized" to its effects. McLuhan provides the example of Eugène Ionesco's play The Bald Soprano, whose dialogue consists entirely of phrases Ionesco pulled from an Assimil language book: "Ionesco originally put all these idiomatic English clichés into literary French which presented the English in the most absurd aspect possible."

McLuhan's archetype "is a quoted extension, medium, technology, or environment." Environment would also include the kinds of "awareness" and cognitive shifts brought upon people by it, not totally unlike the psychological context Carl Jung described.

McLuhan also posits that there is a factor of interplay between the cliché and the archetype, or a "doubleness":

Another theme of the Wake [Finnegans Wake] that helps in the understanding of the paradoxical shift from cliché to archetype is 'past time are pastimes.' The dominant technologies of one age become the games and pastimes of a later age. In the 20th century, the number of 'past times' that are simultaneously available is so vast as to create cultural anarchy. When all the cultures of the world are simultaneously present, the work of the artist in the elucidation of form takes on new scope and new urgency. Most men are pushed into the artist's role. The artist cannot dispense with the principle of 'doubleness' or 'interplay' because this type of hendiadys dialogue is essential to the very structure of consciousness, awareness, and autonomy.

McLuhan relates the cliché-to-archetype process to the Theatre of the Absurd:

Pascal, in the seventeenth century, tells us that the heart has many reasons of which the head knows nothing. The Theater of the Absurd is essentially a communicating to the head of some of the silent languages of the heart which in two or three hundred years it has tried to forget all about. In the seventeenth century world the languages of the heart were pushed down into the unconscious by the dominant print cliché.

The "languages of the heart", or what McLuhan otherwise defined as oral culture, were thus made archetype by means of the printing press, and turned into cliché.

According to McLuhan, the satellite medium encloses the Earth in a man-made environment, which "ends 'Nature' and turns the globe into a repertory theatre to be programmed." All previous environments (book, newspaper, radio, etc.) and their artifacts are retrieved under these conditions ("past times are pastimes"). McLuhan thereby meshes this into the term global theatre. This updates his concept of the global village, which, in its own definitions, can be said to be subsumed into the overall condition of the global theatre.

=== The Global Village (1989) ===
In his posthumous book, The Global Village: Transformations in World Life and Media in the 21st Century (1989), McLuhan, collaborating with Bruce R. Powers, provides a strong conceptual framework for understanding the cultural implications of the technological advances associated with the rise of a worldwide electronic network. This is a major work of McLuhan's as it contains the most extensive elaboration of his concept of acoustic space, and provides a critique of standard 20th-century communication models such as the Shannon–Weaver model.

McLuhan distinguishes between the existing worldview of visual space—a linear, quantitative, classically geometric model—and that of acoustic space—a holistic, qualitative order with an intricate, paradoxical topology: "Acoustic Space has the basic character of a sphere whose focus or center is simultaneously everywhere and whose margin is nowhere." The transition from visual to acoustic space was not automatic with the advent of the global network, but would have to be a conscious project. The "universal environment of simultaneous electronic flow" inherently favors right-brain Acoustic Space, yet we are held back by habits of adhering to a fixed point of view. There are no boundaries to sound. We hear from all directions at once. Yet Acoustic and Visual Space are inseparable. The resonant interval is the invisible borderline between Visual and Acoustic Space. This is like the television camera that the Apollo 8 astronauts focused on the Earth after they had orbited the Moon.

McLuhan illustrates how it feels to exist within acoustic space by quoting from the autobiography of Jacques Lusseyran, And There Was Light. Lusseyran lost his eyesight in a violent accident as a child, and the autobiography describes how a reordering of his sensory life and perception followed:

When I came upon the myth of objectivity in certain modern thinkers, it made me angry. So, there was only one world for these people, the same for everyone. And all the other worlds were to be counted as illusions left over from the past. Or why not call them by their name—hallucinations? I had learned to my cost how wrong they were. From my own experience I knew very well that it was enough to take from a man a memory here, an association there, to deprive him of hearing or sight, for the world to undergo immediate transformation, and for another world, entirely different, but entirely coherent, to be born. Another world? Not really. The same world, rather, but seen from a different angle, and counted in entirely new measures. When this happened all the hierarchies they called objective were turned upside down, scattered to the four winds, not even theories but like whims.

Reading, writing, and hierarchical ordering are associated with the left brain and visual space, as are the linear concept of time and phonetic literacy. The left brain is the locus of analysis, classification, and rationality. The right brain and acoustic space are the locus of the spatial, tactile, and musical. "Comprehensive awareness" results when the two sides of the brain are in true balance. Visual Space is associated with the simplified worldview of Euclidean geometry, the intuitive three dimensions useful for the architecture of buildings and the surveying of land. It is linearly rational and has no grasp of the acoustic. Acoustic Space is multisensory. McLuhan writes about robotism in the context of Japanese Zen Buddhism and how it can offer us new ways of thinking about technology. The Western way of thinking about technology is too related to the left brain, which has a rational and linear focus. What he called robotism might better be called androidism in the wake of Blade Runner and the novels of Philip K. Dick. Robotism-androidism emerges from the further development of the right brain, creativity and a new relationship to spacetime (most humans are still living in 17th-century classical Newtonian physics spacetime). Robots-androids will have much greater flexibility than humans have had until now, in both mind and body. Robots-androids will teach humanity this new flexibility. And this flexibility of androids (what McLuhan calls robotism) has a strong affinity with Japanese culture and life. McLuhan quotes from Ruth Benedict's The Chrysanthemum and the Sword an anthropological study of Japanese culture published in 1946:

Occidentals cannot easily credit the ability of the Japanese to swing from one behavior to another without psychic cost. Such extreme possibilities are not included in our experience. Yet in Japanese life the contradictions, as they seem to us, are as deeply based in their view of life as our uniformities are in ours.

The ability to live in the present and instantly readjust.

==== Beyond existing communication models ====
"All Western scientific models of communication are—like the Shannon–Weaver model—linear, sequential, and logical as a reflection of the late medieval emphasis on the Greek notion of efficient causality." McLuhan and Powers criticize the Shannon-Weaver model of communication as emblematic of left-hemisphere bias and linearity, descended from a print-era perversion of Aristotle's notion of efficient causality.

A third term of The Global Village that McLuhan and Powers develop at length is The Tetrad. McLuhan had begun development on the Tetrad as early as 1974. The tetrad is an analogical, simultaneous, fourfold pattern of transformation. "At full maturity the tetrad reveals the metaphoric structure of the artifact as having two figures and two grounds in dynamic and analogical relationship to each other." Like the camera focused on the Earth by the Apollo 8 astronauts, the tetrad reveals figure (Moon) and ground (Earth) simultaneously. The right-brain hemisphere thinking is the capability of being in many places at the same time. Electricity is acoustic. It is simultaneously everywhere. The Tetrad, with its fourfold Möbius topological structure of enhancement, reversal, retrieval and obsolescence, is mobilized by McLuhan and Powers to illuminate the media or technological inventions of cash money, the compass, the computer, the database, the satellite, and the global media network.

== Key concepts ==
=== Tetrad of media effects ===
In Laws of Media (1988), published posthumously by his son Eric, McLuhan summarized his ideas about media in a concise tetrad of media effects. The tetrad is a means of examining the effects on society of any technology (i.e., any medium) by dividing its effects into four categories and displaying them simultaneously. McLuhan designed the tetrad as a pedagogical tool, phrasing his laws as questions with which to consider any medium:

- What does the medium enhance?
- What does the medium make obsolete?
- What does the medium retrieve that had been obsolesced earlier?
- What does the medium flip into when pushed to extremes?

The laws of the tetrad exist simultaneously, not successively or chronologically, and allow the questioner to explore the "grammar and syntax" of the "language" of media. McLuhan departs from his mentor Harold Innis in suggesting that a medium "overheats," or reverses into an opposing form, when taken to its extreme.

Visually, a tetrad can be depicted as four diamonds forming an X, with the name of a medium in the centre. The two diamonds on the left of a tetrad are the Enhancement and Retrieval qualities of the medium, both Figure qualities. The two diamonds on the right of a tetrad are the Obsolescence and Reversal qualities, both Ground qualities.

A blank tetrad diagram

Using the example of radio:

- Enhancement (figure): What the medium amplifies or intensifies. Radio amplifies news and music via sound.
- Obsolescence (ground): What the medium drives out of prominence. Radio reduces the importance of print and the visual.
- Retrieval (figure): What the medium recovers which was previously lost. Radio returns the spoken word to the forefront.
- Reversal (ground): What the medium does when pushed to its limits. Acoustic radio flips into audio-visual TV.

=== Figure and ground ===
McLuhan adapted the Gestalt psychology idea of a figure and a ground, which underpins the meaning of "the medium is the message." He used this concept to explain how a form of communications technology, the medium, or figure, necessarily operates through its context, or ground.

McLuhan believed that in order to grasp fully the effect of a new technology, one must examine figure (medium) and ground (context) together, since neither is completely intelligible without the other. McLuhan argued that we must study media in their historical context, particularly in relation to the technologies that preceded them. The present environment, itself made up of the effects of previous technologies, gives rise to new technologies, which, in their turn, further affect society and individuals.

All technologies have embedded within them their own assumptions about time and space. The message which the medium conveys can only be understood if the medium and the environment in which the medium is used—and which, simultaneously, it effectively creates—are analysed together. He believed that an examination of the figure-ground relationship can offer a critical commentary on culture and society.

=== Opposition between optic and haptic perception ===
In McLuhan's (and Harley Parker's) work, electric media have an affinity with haptic and hearing perception, while mechanical media have an affinity with visual perception. This opposition between optic and haptic had previously been formulated by art historians Alois Riegl in his 1901 Late Roman Art Industry, and by Erwin Panofsky, in his 1927 Perspective as Symbolic Form.

In his The Work of Art in the Age of Mechanical Reproduction (1935), Walter Benjamin observed how, in perceptions of modern Western culture, from about the 19th century a shift began from the optic toward the haptic. This shift is one of the main recurring topics in McLuhan's work, which McLuhan attributes to the advent of the electronic era.

== Legacy ==
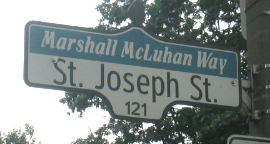
A portion of Toronto's St. Joseph Street is co-named Marshall McLuhan Way.

=== Influence ===
After the publication of Understanding Media, McLuhan received an astonishing amount of publicity, making him perhaps the most-publicized 20th-century English teacher and arguably the most controversial. This publicity began with the work of two California advertising executives, Howard Gossage and Gerald Feigen, who used personal funds to fund their practice of "genius scouting". Much enamoured of McLuhan's work, Feigen and Gossage arranged for McLuhan to meet with editors of several major New York magazines in May 1965 at the Lombardy Hotel in New York. Philip Marchand reports that, as a direct consequence of these meetings, McLuhan was offered the use of an office in the headquarters of both Time and Newsweek anytime he wanted it.

In August 1965, Feigen and Gossage held what they called a "McLuhan festival" in the offices of Gossage's advertising agency in San Francisco. During this "festival", McLuhan met with advertising executives, members of the mayor's office, and editors from the San Francisco Chronicle and Ramparts magazine. More significant was the presence at the festival of Tom Wolfe, who wrote about McLuhan in a subsequent article, "What If He Is Right?", published in New York magazine and in Wolfe's 1968 essay collection The Pump House Gang. According to Feigen and Gossage, their work had only a moderate effect on McLuhan's eventual celebrity: they claimed that their work only "probably speeded up the recognition of his genius by about six months." In any case, McLuhan soon became a fixture of media discourse. Newsweek magazine did a cover story on him; articles appeared in Life, Harper's, Fortune, Esquire, and others. Cartoons about him appeared in The New Yorker. In 1969, Playboy magazine published a lengthy interview with him. In a running gag on the popular sketch comedy Rowan & Martin's Laugh-In, the "poet" Henry Gibson would randomly say, "Marshall McLuhan, what are you doin'?"

McLuhan was credited with coining the phrase Turn on, tune in, drop out by its popularizer, Timothy Leary, in the 1960s. In a 1988 interview with Neil Strauss, Leary said the slogan was "given to him" by McLuhan during a lunch in New York City. Leary said McLuhan "was very much interested in ideas and marketing, and he started singing something like, 'Psychedelics hit the spot / Five hundred micrograms, that’s a lot,' to the tune of a Pepsi commercial. Then he started going, 'Tune in, turn on, and drop out.'"

During his lifetime and afterward, McLuhan heavily influenced cultural critics, thinkers, and media theorists such as Neil Postman, Jean Baudrillard, Timothy Leary, Terence McKenna, William Irwin Thompson, Paul Levinson, Douglas Rushkoff, Jaron Lanier, Hugh Kenner, Joey Skaggs and John David Ebert, as well as political leaders such as Pierre Elliott Trudeau and Jerry Brown. Andy Warhol was paraphrasing McLuhan with his now famous "15 minutes of fame" quote. When asked in the 1970s for a way to sedate violence in Angola, he suggested a massive spread of TV devices. Douglas Coupland argued that McLuhan "was conservative, socially, but he never let politics enter his writing or his teaching".

=== Popular culture ===
Woody Allen's Oscar-winning Annie Hall (1977) featured McLuhan in a cameo as himself. In the film, a pompous academic is arguing with Allen in a cinema queue when McLuhan suddenly appears and silences him, saying, "You know nothing of my work."

The character "Brian O'Blivion" in David Cronenberg's 1983 film Videodrome is a "media oracle" based on McLuhan.

In 1991, McLuhan was named the "patron saint" of Wired magazine and a quote of his appeared on the masthead for the first ten years of its publication.

McLuhan's perspective on the cycle of cultural identity inspired Duke Ellington's album The Afro-Eurasian Eclipse.

He is mentioned by name in a Peter Gabriel–penned lyric in the song "Broadway Melody of 1974", on Genesis's concept album The Lamb Lies Down on Broadway: "Marshall McLuhan, casual viewin', head buried in the sand."

McLuhan is jokingly referred to in an episode of The Sopranos titled "House Arrest".

Despite his death in 1980, someone claiming to be McLuhan posted on a Wired mailing list in 1996. The information this person provided convinced one Wired writer that "if the poster was not McLuhan himself, it was a bot programmed with an eerie command of McLuhan's life and inimitable perspective."

McLuhan is the subject of the 1993 play The Medium, the first major work by the Saratoga International Theater Institute and director Anne Bogart. The play was revived by SITI Company for a farewell tour in 2022.

=== Recognition ===
A new centre known as the McLuhan Program in Culture and Technology, formed soon after his death in 1980, was the successor to McLuhan's Centre for Culture and Technology at the University of Toronto. Since 1994, it was part of the University of Toronto Faculty of Information. In 2008, the centre incorporated in the Coach House Institute, which was subsequently renamed The McLuhan Centre for Culture and Technology. In 2011, at the time of his centenary, the centre established a "Marshall McLuhan Centenary Fellowship" program in his honour. The centre closed in 2023. The Canadian Embassy in Manila awards a Marshall McLuhan Fellowship for "Excellence in Journalism ... that promotes professional, responsible and courageous media."

In Toronto, Marshall McLuhan Catholic Secondary School is named after him.

The media room at Canada House in Berlin is called the Marshall McLuhan Salon. It includes a multimedia information centre and an auditorium, and hosts a permanent exhibition dedicated to McLuhan, based on its collection of film and audio items by and about him.

In 2017, his grandson Andrew McLuhan established the McLuhan Institute, located in Prince Edward County, Ontario.

In 2025, McLuhan's childhood home in Winnipeg was turned into a museum.

== Bibliography of major works ==
This is a partial list of works cited in this article.

- 1951. The Mechanical Bride: Folklore of Industrial Man (1st ed.). New York: Vanguard Press.
  - reissued by Gingko Press, 2002. ISBN 978-1-58423-050-2.
- 1962. The Gutenberg Galaxy: The Making of Typographic Man. (1st ed.). Toronto: University of Toronto Press.
  - reissued by Routledge & Kegan Paul. ISBN 978-0-7100-1818-2.
- 1964. Understanding Media: The Extensions of Man (1st ed.). New York: McGraw Hill.
  - reissued by MIT Press, 1994, with introduction by Lewis H. Lapham; reissued by Gingko Press, 2003. ISBN 978-1-58423-073-1.
- 1967. The Medium Is the Massage: An Inventory of Effects (1st ed.), with Quentin Fiore, produced by Jerome Agel. Random House.
  - reissued by Gingko Press, 2001. ISBN 978-1-58423-070-0.
- 1968. War and Peace in the Global Village (1st ed.), with design/layout by Quentin Fiore, produced by Jerome Agel. New York: Bantam.
  - reissued by Gingko Press, 2001. ISBN 978-1-58423-074-8.
- 1970. From Cliché to Archetype, with Wilfred Watson. New York: Viking. ISBN 978-0-670-33093-5.
- 1988. Laws of Media, edited by Eric McLuhan. Toronto: University of Toronto Press. ISBN 978-0-8020-5782-2.
- 2016 The Future of the Library: From Electronic Media to Digital Media, edited by Robert K. Logan. Peter Lang. ISBN 978-1-4331-3264-3.

== Discography ==
- The Medium Is The Massage: With Marshall McLuhan (1967) Columbia – CS 9501

== See also ==
- Neuroplasticity – Ability of the brain to continuously change
- Cortical remapping – Neurological process
- Social interface – Concept in sociology
- John M. Culkin – American academic and priest (1928–1993)
