= Visual technology =

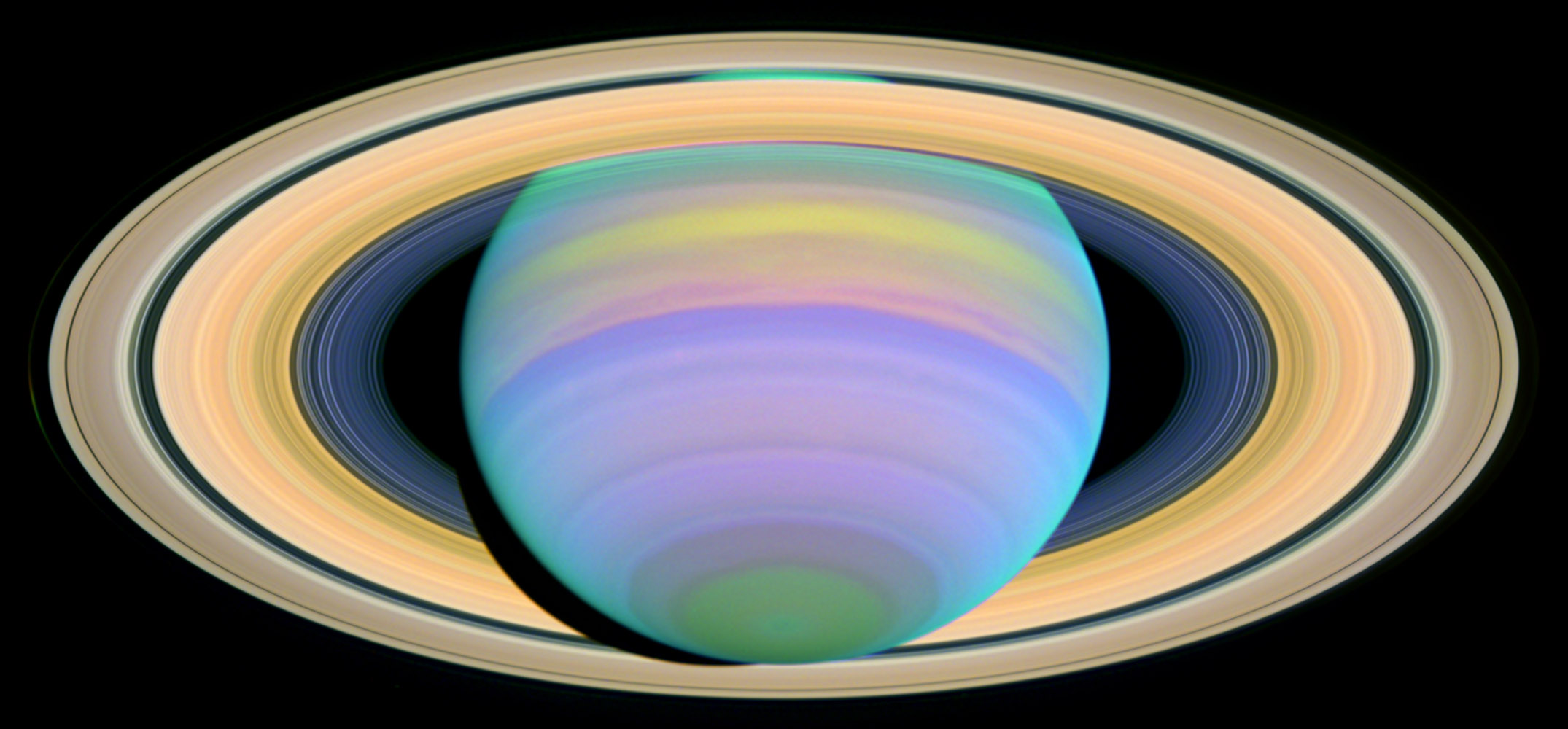
Ultraviolet photography, a visual technology that has applications in astronomy

Visual technology is the engineering discipline dealing with visual representation.

== Types ==
Visual technology includes photography, printing, augmented reality, virtual reality and video.

== See also ==
- Audiovisual
- Audiovisual education
- Information and communications technology
- Medical imaging
- Multimedia
- Technology
- Visual arts
- Visual culture
- Visual perception
- Visual sociology
