= The Gutenberg Galaxy =

1962 book by Marshall McLuhan

The Gutenberg Galaxy: The Making of Typographic Man
- Cover of the first edition
- Author: Marshall McLuhan
- Subject: Media history
- Publisher: University of Toronto Press
- Publication date: 1962
- Publication place: Canada
- Media type: Print (Paperback)
- Pages: 293 p. (numbered)
- ISBN: 978-0-8020-6041-9
- OCLC: 428949

The Gutenberg Galaxy: The Making of Typographic Man is a 1962 book by Marshall McLuhan, in which he analyzes the effects of mass media, especially the printing press, on European culture and human consciousness. It popularized the term global village, which refers to the idea that mass communication allows a village-like mindset to apply to the entire world; and Gutenberg Galaxy, which we may regard today to refer to the accumulated body of recorded works of human art and knowledge, especially books.

McLuhan studies the emergence of what he calls the Gutenberg Man, the subject produced by the change of consciousness wrought by the advent of the printed book. Apropos of his axiom, "The medium is the message," McLuhan argues that technologies are not simply inventions which people employ but are the means by which people are re-invented. The invention of movable type was the decisive moment in the change from a culture in which all the senses partook of a common interplay to a tyranny of the visual. He also argued that the development of the printing press led to the creation of nationalism, dualism, domination of rationalism, automatisation of scientific research, uniformation and standardisation of culture and alienation of individuals.

Movable type, with its ability to reproduce texts accurately and swiftly, extended the drive toward homogeneity and repeatability already in evidence in the emergence of perspectival art and the exigencies of the single "point of view". He writes:

the world of visual perspective is one of unified and homogeneous space. Such a world is alien to the resonating diversity of spoken words. So language was the last art to accept the visual logic of Gutenberg technology, and the first to rebound in the electric age.

== The format of the book—a mosaic ==
The book is unusual in its design. McLuhan described it as one which "develops a mosaic or field approach to its problems". The mosaic image to be constructed from data and quotations would then reveal "causal operations in history".

The book consists of five parts:

- Prologue
- The Gutenberg Galaxy
- The Galaxy Reconfigured
- Bibliographic Index
- Index of Chapter Glosses

The main body of the book, "The Gutenberg Galaxy", consists of 107 short "chapters".

Apparently, McLuhan also had some ideas about how to browse a book. Marshall McLuhan, the guru of The Gutenberg Galaxy (1962), recommends that the browser turn to page 69 of any book and read it. If you like that page, buy the book." Such apparent arbitrariness fits with picking a particular piece (or part) of a mosaic and deciding if you like it. Certainly the McLuhan test can be applied to the Gutenberg Galaxy itself. Doing so will reveal a further insight into the purpose of his own book.

=== Prologue ===
McLuhan declares his book to be "complementary to The Singer of Tales by Albert B. Lord." The latter work follows on from the Homeric studies of Milman Parry who turned to "the study of the Yugoslav epics" to prove that the poems of Homer were oral compositions.

== Four epochs of history ==
The book may also be regarded as a way of describing four epochs of history:

1. Oral tribe culture
2. Manuscript culture
3. Gutenberg galaxy
4. Electronic age

For the break between the time periods in each case the occurrence of a new medium is responsible, the hand-writing terminates the oral phase, the printing and the electricity revolutionizes afterwards culture and society.

Given the clue of "hand-writing" that terminates the "oral phase" one expects "printing" to terminate the manuscript phase and the "electrifying" to bring an end to the Gutenberg era. The strangeness of the use of "electrifying" is entirely appropriate in the McLuhan context of 1962. The Internet did not exist then.

McLuhan himself suggests that the last section of his book might play the major role of being the first section:

The last section of the book, "The Galaxy Reconfigured," deals with the clash of electric and mechanical, or print, technologies, and the reader may find it the best prologue.

=== Oral tribe culture ===
The oral tradition is not dead. In schools or at home or in the street, where children are taught to learn by heart, to memorize, nursery rhymes or poems or songs, then they can be said to participate in the oral tradition. The same is often true of the children belonging to religious groups who are taught to learn to say their prayers. In other words, childhood is one of the ages of man (in Shakespeare's sense) and is essentially an oral tribal culture. The transition from this oral culture takes place when the child is taught to read and write. Then the child enters the world of the manuscript culture.

McLuhan identifies James Joyce's Finnegans Wake as a key that unlocks something of the nature of the oral culture."

Of particular importance to the Oral Culture is the Art of memory.

==== The village ====
In commenting on the then Soviet Union, McLuhan puts "the advertising and PR community" on a par with them in so far that both "are concerned about access to the media and about results." More remarkably he asserts that "Soviet concern with media results is natural to any oral society where interdependence is the result of instant interplay of cause and effect in the total structure. Such is the character of a village, or since electric media, such is also the character of global village."

=== Manuscript culture ===
The culture of the manuscript (literally hand-writing) is often referred to by McLuhan as scribal culture.

Medieval illumination, gloss, and sculpture alike were aspects of the art of memory, central to scribal culture.

Associated with this epoch is the Art of memory (in Latin Ars Memoriae).

=== Gutenberg galaxy ===
Finnegans Wake: Joyce's Finnegans Wake (like Shakespeare's King Lear) is one of the texts which McLuhan frequently uses throughout the book to weave together the various strands of his argument.

Throughout Finnegans Wake Joyce specifies the Tower of Babel as the tower of Sleep, that is, the tower of the witless assumption, or what Bacon calls the reign of the Idols.

==== Movable type ====
His episodic history takes the reader from pre-alphabetic tribal humankind to the electronic age. According to McLuhan, the invention of movable type greatly accelerated, intensified, and ultimately enabled cultural and cognitive changes that had already been taking place since the invention and implementation of the alphabet, by which McLuhan means phonemic orthography. (McLuhan is careful to distinguish the phonetic alphabet from logographic/logogramic writing systems, like hieroglyphics or ideograms.)

Print culture, ushered in by the Gutenberg press in the middle of the fifteenth century, brought about the cultural predominance of the visual over the aural/oral. Quoting with approval an observation on the nature of the printed word from Prints and Visual Communication by William Ivins, McLuhan remarks:

In this passage [Ivins] not only notes the ingraining of lineal, sequential habits, but, even more important, points out the visual homogenizing of experience of print culture, and the relegation of auditory and other sensuous complexity to the background. [...] The technology and social effects of typography incline us to abstain from noting interplay and, as it were, "formal" causality, both in our inner and external lives. Print exists by virtue of the static separation of functions and fosters a mentality that gradually resists any but a separative and compartmentalizing or specialist outlook.

The main concept of McLuhan's argument (later elaborated upon in The Medium is the Massage) is that new technologies (like alphabets, printing presses, and even speech itself) exert a gravitational effect on cognition, which in turn affects social organization: print technology changes our perceptual habits ("visual homogenizing of experience"), which in turn affects social interactions ("fosters a mentality that gradually resists all but a... specialist outlook"). According to McLuhan, the advent of print technology contributed to and made possible most of the salient trends in the Modern period in the Western world: individualism, democracy, Protestantism, capitalism and nationalism. For McLuhan, these trends all reverberate with print technology's principle of "segmentation of actions and functions and principle of visual quantification."

=== Electronic age ===
==== The global village ====
In the early 1960s, McLuhan wrote that the visual, individualistic print culture would soon be brought to an end by what he called "electronic interdependence": when electronic media would replace visual culture with aural/oral culture. In this new age, humankind will move from individualism and fragmentation to a collective identity, with a "tribal base." McLuhan's coinage for this new social organization is the global village.

The term is sometimes described as having negative connotations in The Gutenberg Galaxy, but McLuhan himself was interested in exploring effects, not making value judgments:

Instead of tending towards a vast Alexandrian library the world has become a computer, an electronic brain, exactly as an infantile piece of science fiction. And as our senses have gone outside us, Big Brother goes inside. So, unless aware of this dynamic, we shall at once move into a phase of panic terrors, exactly befitting a small world of tribal drums, total interdependence, and superimposed co-existence. [...] Terror is the normal state of any oral society, for in it everything affects everything all the time. [...] In our long striving to recover for the Western world a unity of sensibility and of thought and feeling we have no more been prepared to accept the tribal consequences of such unity than we were ready for the fragmentation of the human psyche by print culture.

Key to McLuhan's argument is the idea that technology has no per se moral bent—it is a tool that profoundly shapes an individual's and, by extension, a society's self-conception and realization:

Is it not obvious that there are always enough moral problems without also taking a moral stand on technological grounds? [...] Print is the extreme phase of alphabet culture that detribalizes or decollectivizes man in the first instance. Print raises the visual features of alphabet to highest intensity of definition. Thus print carries the individuating power of the phonetic alphabet much further than manuscript culture could ever do. Print is the technology of individualism. If men decided to modify this visual technology by an electric technology, individualism would also be modified. To raise a moral complaint about this is like cussing a buzz-saw for lopping off fingers. "But", someone says, "we didn't know it would happen." Yet even witlessness is not a moral issue. It is a problem, but not a moral problem; and it would be nice to clear away some of the moral fogs that surround our technologies. It would be good for morality.

The moral valence of technology's effects on cognition is, for McLuhan, a matter of perspective. For instance, McLuhan contrasts the considerable alarm and revulsion that the growing quantity of books aroused in the latter seventeenth century with the modern concern for the "end of the book." If there can be no universal moral sentence passed on technology, McLuhan believes that "there can only be disaster arising from unawareness of the causalities and effects inherent in our technologies."

Though the World Wide Web was invented thirty years after The Gutenberg Galaxy was published, McLuhan may have coined and certainly popularized the usage of the term "surfing" to refer to rapid, irregular and multidirectional movement through a heterogeneous body of documents or knowledge, e.g., statements like "Heidegger surf-boards along on the electronic wave as triumphantly as Descartes rode the mechanical wave." Paul Levinson's 1999 book Digital McLuhan explores the ways that McLuhan's work can be better understood through the lens of the digital revolution. Later, Bill Stewart's 2007 "Living Internet" website describes how McLuhan's "insights made the concept of a global village, interconnected by an electronic nervous system, part of our popular culture well before it actually happened."

McLuhan frequently quoted Walter Ong's Ramus, Method, and the Decay of Dialogue (1958), which evidently had prompted McLuhan to write The Gutenberg Galaxy. Ong wrote a highly favorable review of this new book in America. However, Ong later tempered his praise, by describing McLuhan's The Gutenberg Galaxy as "a racy survey, indifferent to some scholarly detail, but uniquely valuable in suggesting the sweep and depth of the cultural and psychological changes entailed in the passage from illiteracy to print and beyond."

McLuhan's The Gutenberg Galaxy won Canada's highest literary award, the Governor-General's Award for Non-Fiction, in 1962. The chairman of the selection committee was McLuhan's colleague at the University of Toronto and oftentime intellectual sparring partner, Northrop Frye.

== See also ==
- Media ecology
- Technological determinism
