= Figure and ground (media) =

Figure and ground is a concept drawn from Gestalt psychology by media theorist Marshall McLuhan in the early 1970s. This concept underpins the meaning of his famous phrase, "The medium is the message". The concept was an approach to what was called "perceptual organization." He began to use the terms figure and ground as a way "to describe the parts of a situation" and "to help explain his ideas about media and human communication." The concept was later employed to explain how a communications technology, the medium or figure, necessarily operates through its context, or ground.

== Overview ==
To McLuhan, "'figure' refers to something that jumps out at us, something that grabs our attention, [whereas] ‘ground’ refers to something that supports or contextualizes a situation and is usually an area of unattention." When we first experience a new image or sensation, there are certain aspects of the object that grab our attention and engage us and certain aspects that we unintentionally ignore. We should not focus on just the "figure" or the "ground" though, as McLuhan believed that both were equally as important to understanding the full meaning of the situation. "This distinction between that which is perceived and that which is blocked out in order to focus perception is central for McLuhan."

McLuhan used different words to describe the figure/ground relationship, sometimes using content for figure and environment or, more often, medium for ground.

"McLuhan looked at media through a figure/ground relationship." To him, people tended to focus on only specific parts of the media, and disregard other parts. "To examine the total effect of any medium, McLuhan pointed out that we need to look at both figure AND ground, and their relationship to one another." He believed that "only focusing on the ‘content’ of the media was like looking at figures without examining their ground." "The ground, or environment, is not a passive container, but active processes that influence the relationships between all of the elements in it".

McLuhan believed that to fully grasp the impact of a new technology in regard to figure (medium) and ground (context), one must understand that the whole is greater than the sum of its parts. Neither piece is definitive without the other. His Understanding Media explores different grounds as they are structured by different media including print, radio, and television.

Al Held, a well-known artist, exemplifies this idea in one of his paintings. The work is called The Big N and it "provides us with an introduction to the concepts of figure and ground." Looking at a glance, you might draw your attention to the black triangles. "Once you were given the name of the painting, however, the frame became linked to the figures, and an 'N' suddenly appeared." In understanding the work, it is important to look at the bigger picture. Al Held's painting is well known for its display of framing, or context, and its importance to the meaning of the overall situation. If either the frame or the painting itself were to change, the interpretation of the work might shift. Pertaining to media, we must look at both the figure and the ground to "understand [its] effects." The ground which media creates gives a context for human communication, and thus "directs human action in unique and important ways."

McLuhan argued that we must study media in their historical context, particularly in relation to those technologies that preceded them. The present environment, itself made up of the effects of previous technologies, gives rise to new technologies, which, in turn, further shape societies and individuals.

Furthermore, all technologies have embedded within them their own assumptions about time and space. Again, the message conveyed by the medium can only be understood if the medium is concurrently analyzed with the environment in which it is used — and which, simultaneously, it effectively creates. McLuhan believed that an examination of the figure-ground relationship can offer a critical commentary on culture and society.

Alternately, the idea of "figure" can also refer to content of a particular medium, while "ground" refers to the medium itself. McLuhan's aphorism "The medium is the message" can thus be read as an attempt to draw attention away from a preoccupation with the figure/message to a consideration of the importance of the ground/medium.

== See also ==
- Figure-ground (perception)
