= Tetrad of media effects =

Analytical tool in cultural studies

A blank tetrad diagram

Marshall McLuhan's tetrad of media effects uses a tetrad—a four-part construct—to examine the effects on society of any technology/medium (that is, a means of explaining the social processes underlying the adoption of a technology/medium) by dividing its effects into four categories and displaying them simultaneously. The tetrad first appeared in print in articles by McLuhan in the journals Technology and Culture (1975) and et cetera (1977). It first appeared in book form in his posthumously-published works Laws of Media (1988) and The Global Village (1989).

== The tetrad ==
The tetrad consists of four questions.

1. What does the medium enhance?
2. What does the medium make obsolete?
3. What does the medium retrieve that had been obsolesced earlier?
4. What does the medium reverse or flip into when pushed to extremes?

The laws of the tetrad exist simultaneously, not successively or chronologically, and allow the questioner to explore the "grammar and syntax" of the "language" of media. McLuhan departs from the media theory of Harold Innis in suggesting that a medium "overheats", or reverses into an opposing form, when taken to its extreme.

Visually, a tetrad can be depicted as four diamonds forming an X, with the name of a medium in the center, where the left/right direction reflects the figure/ground association. The two diamonds on the left of a tetrad are the Enhancement and Retrieval qualities of the medium, both Figure qualities. The two diamonds on the right of a tetrad are the Obsolescence and Reversal qualities, both Ground qualities.

- Enhancement (figure): What the medium amplifies or intensifies. For example, radio amplifies news and music via sound.
- Obsolescence (ground): What the medium drives out of prominence. Radio reduces the prominence of print and the visual.
- Retrieval (figure): What the medium recovers which was previously lost. Radio returns the spoken word to the forefront.
- Reversal (ground): What the medium does when pushed to its limits. Acoustic radio flips into audio-visual TV.

== See also ==
- Figure and ground (media)
- Hot and cool media
- Media ecology
- Time- and space-bias

== Sources ==
- McLuhan, Marshall, "McLuhan's Laws of the Media", Technology and Culture, January 1975.
- McLuhan, Marshall, "Laws of the Media," ETC: A Review of General Semantics, June 1977, pp. 173-179, with Preface by Paul Levinson.
- Zingrone, Frank, "Laws of Media: The Pentad and Technical Syncretism", McLuhan Studies 1 (1991).
- McLuhan, Marshall & McLuhan, Eric, (1988). Laws of Media, Toronto: University of Toronto Press. ISBN 978-0-8020-5782-2.
- McLuhan, Marshall & Powers, Bruce R., (1989). The Global Village: Transformations in World Life and Media in the 21st Century, Oxford University Press.
