= Fordham Experiment =

Psychology experiment

The Fordham Experiment was an experiment done as part of a course on The Effects of Television by Eric McLuhan and Harley Parker at Fordham University in 1967 and 1968. The purpose of the experiment was to demonstrate to the students that there was a difference between the effects of movies and those of TV on an audience, and to try to ascertain what some of those differences might be.

The distinction was thought to occur because movies present reflected light ('light on') to the viewer, while a TV picture is back lit ('light through'). The experimenters showed two movies, a documentary and a film with little story line about horses, sequentially to two groups of equivalent size, and had the viewers write a half a page of comments of their reactions.

The groups' reactions to one of the films were roughly similar. Distinct reactions, however, were found for the other. Generally, the 'light on' (movie) presentation was perceived as having lowered tactility and heightened visuality, as compared to the heightened tactility and lessened visuality of the 'light through' (TV) presentation.

Visuality dropped from 'light on' to 'light-through':

- Comments on cinematic technique dropped from 36% with 'light on' to below 20% with 'light-through'
- Comments on specific scenes dropped from 51% to 20%
- Objective comments on a 'sense of power' in the animals dropped from 60% to 20%

Tactility increased from 'light on' to 'light through':

- Comments on sensory evocation and a sense of involvement and tenseness increased from 6% with 'light on' to 36% with 'light through'
- Comments on a feeling of a loss of sense of time rose from 6% to 40%
- Comments on a sense of total involvement rose from 15% to 64%
- Comments on a sense of total emotional involvement rose from 12% to 48%

The researchers concluded that the 'light on' subjects exhibited a sensory shift characterized by a drop in visual sense and an increase in tactile sense.

Although this experiment has validity, it does not deal directly with the central point made by Marshall McLuhan that the cinema image, typically a 35mm frame, is made up of millions of dots, or emulsion, and is much more 'saturated' than the lines and pixels of the TV image. McLuhan argued that the TV screen invited the audience to 'fill-in' a low-intensity image, much like following the bounding lines of a cartoon. That made TV more 'involving' and more tactile. The high-intensity film image allows for much more information on screen, but also demands a higher degree of visual perception and cognition. In that sense, he said, film is a 'hot' medium, TV a 'cool' bath.
