= English titles =

English titles may refer to:

- The Peerage of England
- When to capitalize titles of works in English
- English honorifics such as "Mr.", "Miss", "Mrs.", or "Dr.", sometimes referred to as "titles"
