= Internet =

Global system of connected computer networks

The internet (or Internet) (Note: See Capitalization of internet) is the global system of interconnected computer networks that uses the internet protocol suite (TCP/IP) (Note: Despite the name, TCP/IP also includes UDP traffic, which is of significant size.) to communicate between networks and devices. It is a network of networks that comprises private, public, academic, business, and government networks of local to global scope, linked by electronic, wireless, and optical networking technologies. The internet carries a vast range of information services and resources, such as the interlinked hypertext documents and applications of the World Wide Web (WWW), electronic mail, discussion groups, internet telephony, streaming media and file sharing.

Most traditional communication media, including telephone, radio, television, paper mail, newspapers, and print publishing, have been transformed by the internet, giving rise to new media such as email, online music, digital newspapers, news aggregators, and audio and video streaming websites. The internet has enabled and accelerated new forms of personal interaction through instant messaging, internet forums, and social networking services. Online shopping has also grown to occupy a significant market across industries, enabling firms to extend brick and mortar presences to serve larger markets. Business-to-business and financial services on the internet affect supply chains across entire industries.

The origins of the internet date back to research that enabled the time-sharing of computer resources, the development of packet switching, and the design of computer networks for data communication. The set of communication protocols to enable internetworking on the internet arose from research and development commissioned in the 1970s by the Defense Advanced Research Projects Agency (DARPA) of the United States Department of Defense in collaboration with universities and researchers across the United States, the United Kingdom and France.

The internet has no single centralized governance in either technological implementation or policies for access and usage. Each constituent network sets its own policies. The overarching definitions of the two principal name spaces on the internet, the internet protocol address (IP address) space and the Domain Name System (DNS), are directed by a maintainer organization, the Internet Corporation for Assigned Names and Numbers (ICANN). The technical underpinning and standardization of the core protocols is an activity of the non-profit Internet Engineering Task Force (IETF).

== Terminology ==
The word internetted was used as early as 1849, meaning interconnected or interwoven. The word internet was used in 1945 by the United States War Department in a radio operator's manual, and in 1974 as the shorthand form of internetwork. Today, the term internet most commonly refers to the global system of interconnected computer networks, though it may also refer to any group of smaller networks.

The word internet may be capitalized as a proper noun, although this is becoming less common. This reflects the tendency in English to capitalize new terms and move them to lowercase as they become familiar. The word is sometimes still capitalized to distinguish the global internet from smaller networks, though many publications, including the AP Stylebook since 2016, recommend the lowercase form in every case. In 2016, the Oxford English Dictionary found that, based on a study of around 2.5 billion printed and online sources, "internet" was capitalized in 54% of cases.

The terms internet and World Wide Web are often used interchangeably; it is common to speak of "going on the internet" when using a web browser to view web pages. However, the World Wide Web, or the Web, is only one of a large number of internet services. It is the global collection of web pages, documents and other web resources linked by hyperlinks and URLs.

== History ==
=== 1960s ===
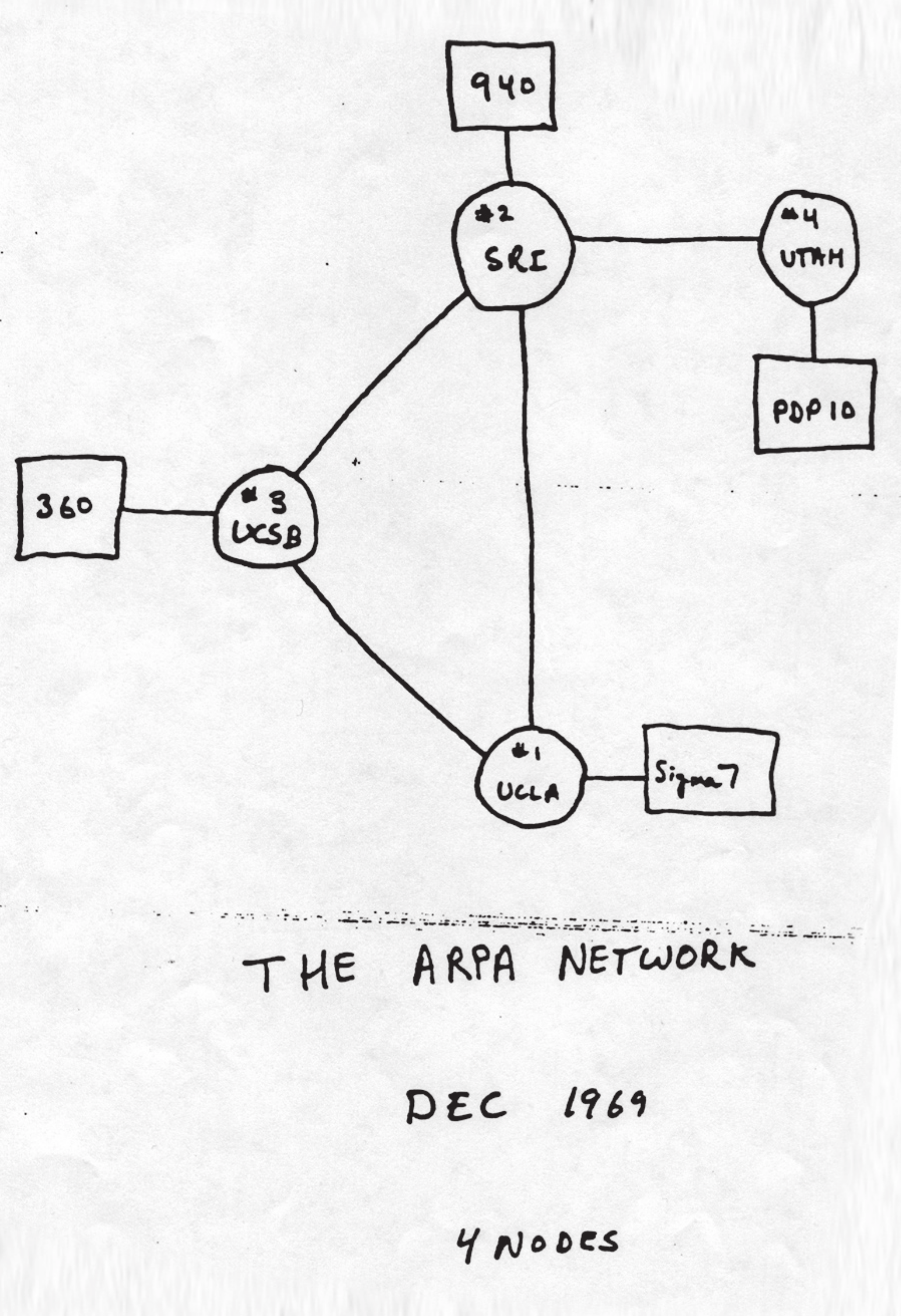
A sketch of the ARPANET in December 1969. The nodes 1–4, and computers: SDS Sigma 7 at UCLA, SDS 940 at Stanford Research Institute (SRI), IBM 360/75 at UCSB and the PDP-10 at University of Utah are depicted.

In the 1960s, computer scientists began developing systems for time-sharing of computer resources. J. C. R. Licklider proposed the idea of a universal network while working at Bolt Beranek & Newman and, later, leading the Information Processing Techniques Office at the Advanced Research Projects Agency (ARPA) of the United States Department of Defense. Research into packet switching, (Note: Computers communicate over the Internet by breaking up messages (emails, images, videos, web pages, files, etc.) into small chunks called packets, which are routed through a network of computers, until they reach their destination, where they are assembled back into a complete message again.) one of the fundamental internet technologies, started in the work of Paul Baran at RAND in the early 1960s and, independently, Donald Davies at the United Kingdom's National Physical Laboratory (NPL) in 1965.

After the Symposium on Operating Systems Principles in 1967, packet switching from the proposed NPL network was incorporated into the design of the ARPANET, an experimental resource sharing network proposed by ARPA. ARPANET development began with two network nodes which were interconnected between the University of California, Los Angeles and the Stanford Research Institute on 29 October 1969. The third site on the ARPANET was the Culler-Fried Interactive Mathematics Center at the University of California, Santa Barbara followed by the fourth, the Graphics Department at the University of Utah.

=== 1970s ===
By the end of 1971, 15 sites were connected to the young ARPANET, mainly in metropolitan areas of Los Angeles, San Francisco, and Boston. Thereafter, the ARPANET gradually developed into a decentralized communications network, connecting remote centers and military bases in the United States. Other user networks and research networks, such as the Merit Network and CYCLADES, were developed in the late 1960s and early 1970s. Early international collaborations for the ARPANET were rare. Connections were made in 1973 to Norway (NORSAR and, later, NDRE) and to Peter Kirstein's research group at University College London, which provided a gateway to British academic networks, the first internetwork for resource sharing.

ARPA projects, the International Network Working Group and commercial initiatives led to the development of various protocols and standards by which multiple separate networks could become a single network, or a network of networks. In 1974, Vint Cerf at Stanford University and Bob Kahn at DARPA published a proposal for "A Protocol for Packet Network Intercommunication". Cerf and his graduate students used the term internet as a shorthand for internetwork in RFC 675. The Internet Experiment Notes and later RFCs repeated this use. The work of Louis Pouzin and Robert Metcalfe had important influences on the resulting TCP/IP design. National PTTs and commercial providers developed the X.25 standard and deployed it on public data networks.

=== 1980s ===
The ARPANET initially served as a backbone for the interconnection of regional academic and military networks in the United States to enable resource sharing. Access to the ARPANET was expanded in 1981 when the National Science Foundation (NSF) funded the Computer Science Network (CSNET).

In 1982, the internet protocol suite (TCP/IP) was standardized, which facilitated worldwide proliferation of interconnected networks. TCP/IP network access expanded again in 1986 when the National Science Foundation Network (NSFNet) provided access to supercomputer sites in the United States for researchers, first at speeds of 56 kbit/s and later at 1.5 Mbit/s and 45 Mbit/s.

The NSFNet expanded into academic and research organizations in Europe, Australia, New Zealand and Japan in 1988–89. Although other network protocols such as UUCP and PTT public data networks had global reach well before this time, this marked the beginning of the internet as an intercontinental network. Commercial internet service providers emerged in 1989 in the United States and Australia. The ARPANET was decommissioned in 1990.

=== 1990s ===
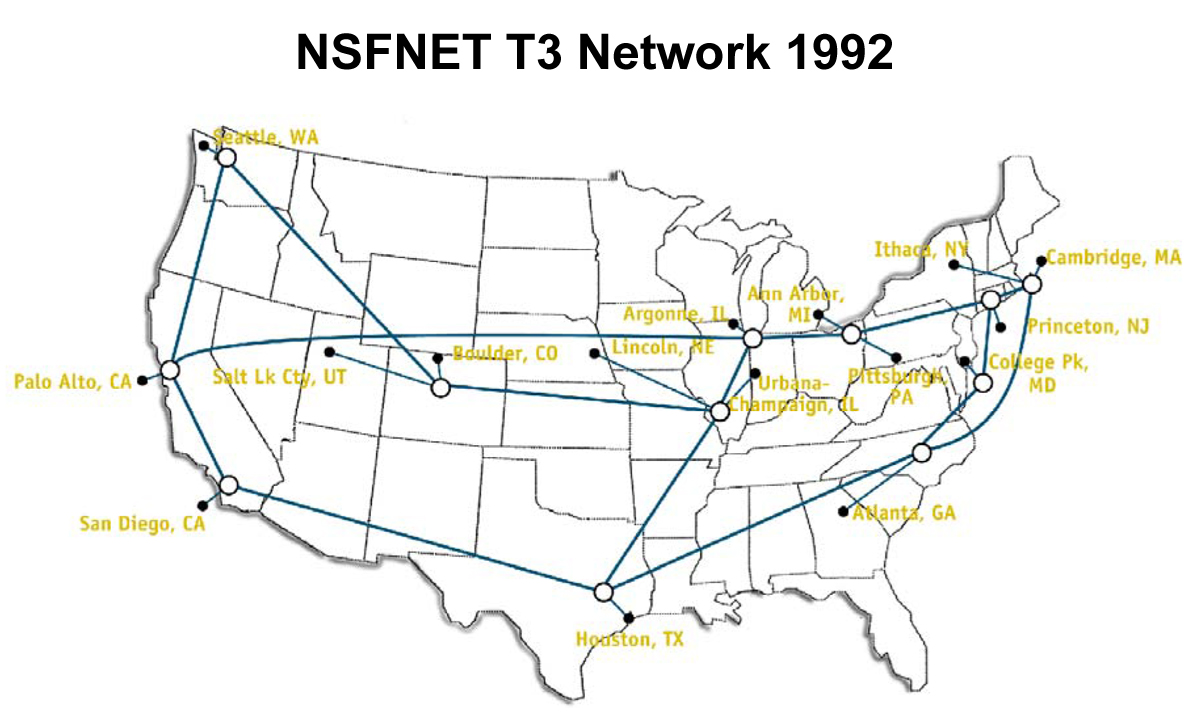
T3 NSFNET Backbone, c. 1992

The linking of commercial networks and enterprises by the early 1990s, as well as the advent of the World Wide Web, marked the beginning of the transition to the modern internet. Steady advances in semiconductor technology and optical networking created new economic opportunities for commercial involvement in the expansion of the network in its core and for delivering services to the public. In mid-1989, MCI Mail and Compuserve established connections to the internet, delivering email and public access products to the half million users of the internet.

Just months later, on 1 January 1990, PSInet launched an alternate internet backbone for commercial use; one of the networks that added to the core of the commercial internet of later years. In March 1990, the first high-speed T1 (1.5 Mbit/s) link between the NSFNET and Europe was installed between Cornell University and CERN, allowing much more robust communications than were capable with satellites.

Later in 1990, Tim Berners-Lee began writing WorldWideWeb, the first web browser, after two years of lobbying CERN management. By Christmas 1990, Berners-Lee had built all the tools necessary for a working Web: the HyperText Transfer Protocol (HTTP) 0.9, the HyperText Markup Language (HTML), the first Web browser (which was also an HTML editor and could access Usenet newsgroups and FTP files), the first HTTP server software (later known as CERN httpd), the first web server, and the first Web pages that described the project itself.

In 1991 the Commercial Internet eXchange was founded, allowing PSInet to communicate with the other commercial networks CERFnet and Alternet. Stanford Federal Credit Union was the first financial institution to offer online internet banking services to all of its members in October 1994. In 1996, OP Financial Group, also a cooperative bank, became the second online bank in the world and the first in Europe. By 1995, the internet was fully commercialized in the U.S. when the NSFNet was decommissioned, removing the last restrictions on use of the internet to carry commercial traffic.

As technology advanced and commercial opportunities fueled reciprocal growth, the volume of internet traffic started experiencing similar characteristics as that of the scaling of MOS transistors, exemplified by Moore's law, doubling every 18 months. This growth, formalized as Edholm's law, was catalyzed by advances in MOS technology, laser light wave systems, and noise performance.

=== 21st century ===
Worldwide Internet users
	2005	2010	2017	2023
World population (billions)	6.5	6.9	7.4	8.0
Worldwide	16%	30%	48%	67%
In developing world	8%	21%	41.3%	60%
In developed world	51%	67%	81%	93%

Since 1995, the internet has tremendously impacted culture and commerce, including the rise of near-instant communication by email, instant messaging, telephony (Voice over internet protocol or VoIP), two-way interactive video calls, and the World Wide Web. Increasing amounts of data are transmitted at higher and higher speeds over fiber optic networks operating at 1 Gbit/s, 10 Gbit/s, or more. The internet continues to grow, driven by ever-greater amounts of online information and knowledge, commerce, entertainment and social networking services.

During the late 1990s, it was estimated that traffic on the public internet grew by 100 percent per year, while the mean annual growth in the number of internet users was thought to be between 20% and 50%. This growth is often attributed to the lack of central administration, which allows organic growth of the network, as well as the non-proprietary nature of the internet protocols, which encourages vendor interoperability and prevents any one company from exerting too much control over the network.

In November 2006, the internet was included on USA Today's list of the New Seven Wonders. As of 31 March 2011, the estimated total number of internet users was 2.095 billion (30% of world population). It is estimated that in 1993 the internet carried only 1% of the information flowing through two-way telecommunication. By 2000 this figure had grown to 51%, and by 2007 more than 97% of all telecommunicated information was carried over the internet. Modern smartphones can access the internet through cellular carrier networks, and internet usage by mobile and tablet devices exceeded desktop worldwide for the first time in October 2016. As of 2018, 80% of the world's population were covered by a 4G network.

==== Mobile communication ====
Number of mobile cellular subscriptions 2012–2016

The International Telecommunication Union (ITU) estimated that, by the end of 2017, 48% of individual users regularly connect to the internet, up from 34% in 2012. Mobile internet connectivity has played an important role in expanding access in recent years, especially in Asia and the Pacific and in Africa. The number of unique mobile cellular subscriptions increased from 3.9 billion in 2012 to 4.8 billion in 2016, two-thirds of the world's population, with more than half of subscriptions located in Asia and the Pacific.

The limits that users face on accessing information via mobile applications coincide with a broader process of fragmentation of the internet. Fragmentation restricts access to media content and tends to affect the poorest users the most. One solution, zero-rating, is the practice of internet service providers allowing users free connectivity to access specific content or applications without cost.

== Social impact ==
The internet has enabled new forms of social interaction, activities, and social associations, giving rise to the scholarly study of the sociology of the internet.

=== Users ===
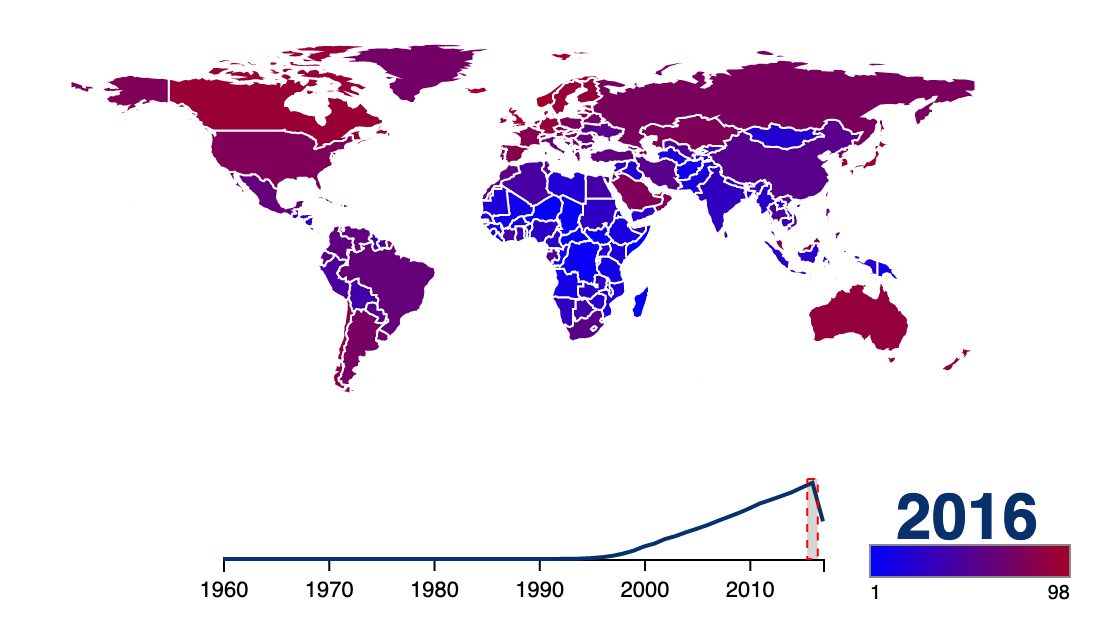
Share of population using the internet. Source data.

Internet users per 100 population members and GDP per capita for selected countries

Internet users per 100 inhabitants Source: International Telecommunication Union.

Between 2000 and 2009, the number of internet users globally rose from 390 million to 1.9 billion. By 2010, 22% of the world's population had access to computers with 1 billion Google searches every day, 300 million internet users reading blogs, and 2 billion videos viewed daily on YouTube. In 2014 the world's internet users surpassed 3 billion or 44 percent of world population, but two-thirds came from the richest countries, with 78 percent of Europeans using the internet, followed by 57 percent of the Americas. However, by 2018, Asia alone accounted for 51% of all internet users, with 2.2 billion out of the 4.3 billion internet users in the world. China's internet users surpassed a major milestone in 2018, when the country's internet regulatory authority, China Internet Network Information Centre, announced that China had 802 million users. China was followed by India, with some 700 million users, with the United States third with 275 million users.

However, in terms of penetration, in 2022, China had a 70% penetration rate compared to India's 60% and the United States's 90%. In 2022, 54% of the world's internet users were based in Asia, 14% in Europe, 7% in North America, 10% in Latin America and the Caribbean, 11% in Africa, 4% in the Middle East and 1% in Oceania. In 2019, Kuwait, Qatar, the Falkland Islands, Bermuda and Iceland had the highest internet penetration by the number of users, with 93% or more of the population with access. As of 2025, the International Telecommunication Union estimated that 6 billion people, or 74% of the world's population, used the internet, while 2.2 billion people remained offline.

Early computer systems were limited to the characters in the American Standard Code for Information Interchange (ASCII), a subset of the Latin alphabet. After English (27%), the most requested languages on the World Wide Web are Chinese (25%), Spanish (8%), Japanese (5%), Portuguese and German (4% each), Arabic, French and Russian (3% each), and Korean (2%). Modern character encoding standards, such as Unicode, allow for development and communication in the world's widely used languages. However, some glitches such as mojibake (incorrect display of some languages' characters) still remain.

Several neologisms exist that refer to internet users: Netizen (as in "citizen of the net") refers to those actively involved in improving online communities, the internet in general or surrounding political affairs and rights such as free speech, Internaut refers to operators or technically highly capable users of the internet, digital citizen refers to a person using the internet in order to engage in society, politics, and government participation.

Internet users by language

Website content languages

=== Usage ===
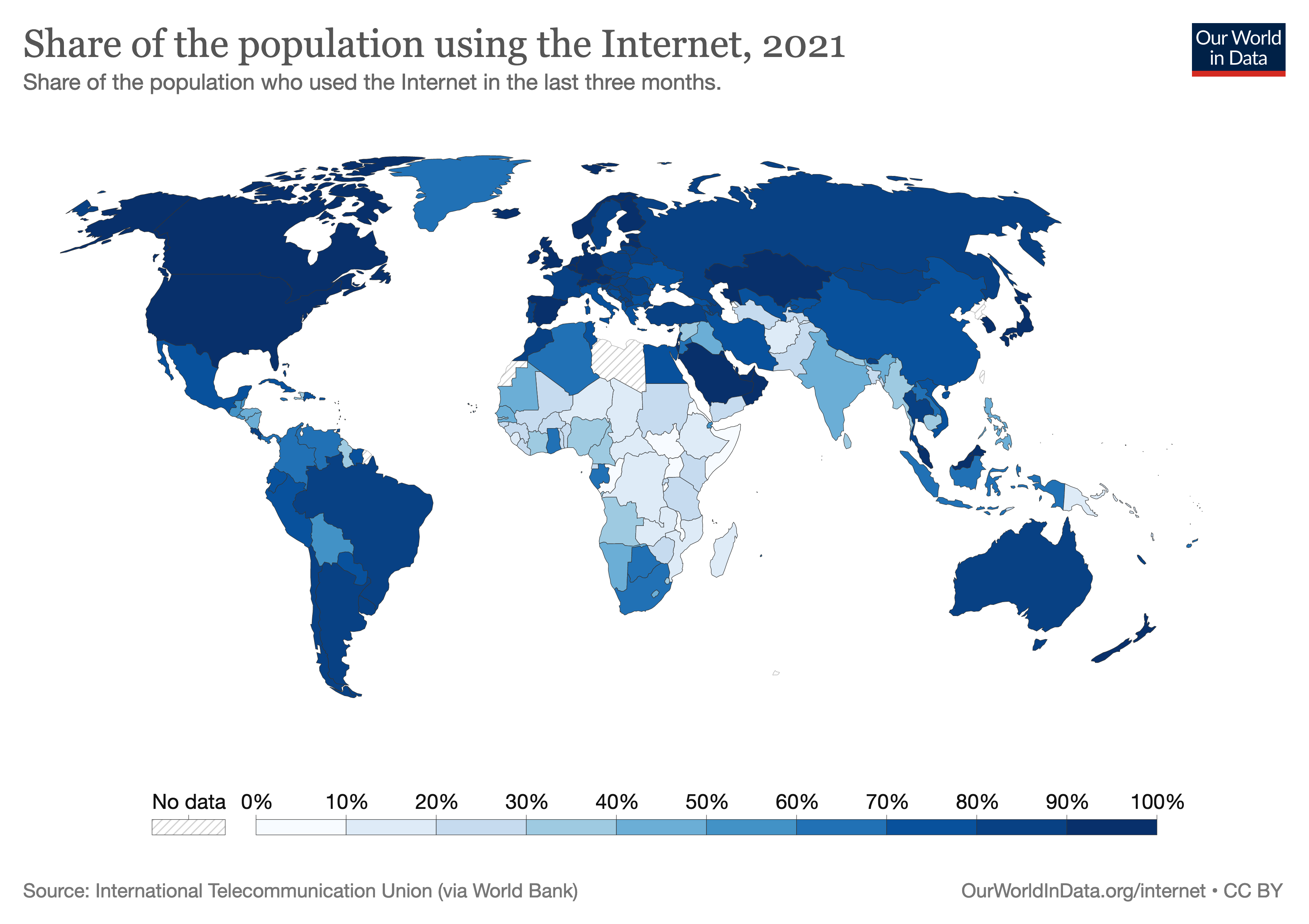
Internet users in 2021 as a percentage of a country's population Source: Our World in Data.

Fixed broadband internet subscriptions in 2012 as a percentage of a country's population Source: International Telecommunication Union.

Mobile broadband internet subscriptions in 2012 as a percentage of a country's population Source: International Telecommunication Union.

The internet allows greater flexibility in working hours and location, especially with the spread of unmetered high-speed connections. The internet can be accessed almost anywhere by numerous means, including through mobile internet devices. Mobile phones, datacards, handheld game consoles and cellular routers allow users to connect to the internet wirelessly.

==== Information and education ====
Educational material at all levels from pre-school (e.g. CBeebies) to post-doctoral (e.g. scholarly literature through Google Scholar) is available on websites. The internet has facilitated the development of virtual universities and distance education, enabling both formal and informal education. The internet allows researchers to conduct research remotely via virtual laboratories, with profound changes in reach and generalizability of findings as well as in communication between scientists and in the publication of results. By the late 2010s the internet had been described as "the main source of scientific information "for the majority of the global North population".

Wikis have also been used in the academic community for sharing and dissemination of information across institutional and international boundaries. In those settings, they have been found useful for collaboration on grant writing, strategic planning, departmental documentation, and committee work. The United States Patent and Trademark Office uses a wiki to allow the public to collaborate on finding prior art relevant to examination of pending patent applications. Queens, New York has used a wiki to allow citizens to collaborate on the design and planning of a local park. The English Wikipedia has the largest user base among wikis on the World Wide Web and ranks in the top 10 among all sites in terms of traffic.

==== Entertainment ====
The internet has been a major outlet for leisure activity since its inception, with entertaining social experiments such as MUDs and MOOs being conducted on university servers, and humor-related Usenet groups receiving much traffic. Many internet forums have sections devoted to games and funny videos.

Another area of leisure activity on the internet is multiplayer gaming. This form of recreation creates communities, where people of all ages and origins enjoy the fast-paced world of multiplayer games. These range from MMORPG to first-person shooters, from role-playing video games to online gambling. While online gaming has been around since the 1970s, modern modes of online gaming began with subscription services such as GameSpy and MPlayer.

Streaming media is the real-time delivery of digital media for immediate consumption or enjoyment by end users. Streaming companies (such as Netflix, Disney+, Amazon's Prime Video, Mubi, Hulu, and Apple TV+) now dominate the entertainment industry, eclipsing traditional broadcasters. Audio streamers such as Spotify and Apple Music also have significant market share in the audio entertainment market.

Video sharing websites are also a major factor in the entertainment ecosystem. YouTube was founded on 15 February 2005 and is now the leading website for free streaming video with more than two billion users. It uses a web player to stream and show video files. YouTube users watch hundreds of millions, and upload hundreds of thousands, of videos daily. Other video sharing websites include Vimeo, Instagram and TikTok.

==== Pornography ====
Although many governments have attempted to restrict both internet pornography and online gambling, this has generally failed to stop their widespread popularity.

A number of advertising-funded ostensible video sharing websites known as "tube sites" have been created to host shared pornographic video content. Due to laws requiring the documentation of the origin of pornography, these websites now largely operate in conjunction with pornographic movie studios and their own independent creator networks, acting as de facto video streaming services. Major players in this field include the market leader Aylo, the operator of PornHub and numerous other branded sites, as well as other independent operators such as xHamster and Xvideos. As of 2023, internet traffic to pornographic video sites rivalled that of mainstream video streaming and sharing services.

==== Remote work ====
Remote work is facilitated by tools such as groupware, virtual private networks, conference calling, videotelephony, and VoIP so that work may be performed from any location, such as the worker's home.

==== Philanthropy ====
The spread of low-cost internet access in developing countries has opened up new possibilities for peer-to-peer charities, which allow individuals to contribute small amounts to charitable projects for other individuals. Websites, such as DonorsChoose and GlobalGiving, allow small-scale donors to direct funds to individual projects of their choice. A popular twist on internet-based philanthropy is the use of peer-to-peer lending for charitable purposes. Kiva pioneered this concept in 2005, offering the first web-based service to publish individual loan profiles for funding.

=== Software ===
The low cost and nearly instantaneous sharing of ideas, knowledge, and skills have made collaborative work dramatically easier, with the help of collaborative software, which allow groups to easily form, cheaply communicate, and share ideas. An example of collaborative software is the free software movement, which has produced, among other things, Linux, Mozilla Firefox, and OpenOffice.org (later forked into LibreOffice). Content management systems allow collaborating teams to work on shared sets of documents simultaneously without accidentally destroying each other's work.

The internet also allows for cloud computing, virtual private networks, remote desktops, and remote work.

=== Psychology ===
The online disinhibition effect describes the tendency of many individuals to behave more stridently or offensively online than they would in person. A significant number of feminist women have been the target of various forms of harassment, including insults and hate speech, to, in extreme cases, rape and death threats, in response to posts they have made on social media. Social media companies have been criticized in the past for not doing enough to aid victims of online abuse.

Children also face dangers online such as cyberbullying and approaches by sexual predators, who sometimes pose as children themselves. Due to naivety, they may also post personal information about themselves online, which could put them or their families at risk unless warned not to do so. Many parents choose to enable internet filtering or supervise their children's online activities in an attempt to protect their children from pornography or violent content on the internet. The most popular social networking services commonly forbid users under the age of 13. However, these policies can be circumvented by registering an account with a false birth date, and a significant number of children aged under 13 join such sites. Social networking services for younger children, which claim to provide better levels of protection for children, also exist.

Internet usage has been correlated to users' loneliness. Lonely people tend to use the internet as an outlet for their feelings and to share their stories with others, such as in the "I am lonely will anyone speak to me" thread.

Cyberslacking can become a drain on corporate resources; employees spend a significant amount of time surfing the Web while at work. internet addiction disorder is excessive computer use that interferes with daily life. Nicholas G. Carr believes that internet use has other effects on individuals, for instance improving skills of scan-reading and interfering with the deep thinking that leads to true creativity.

=== Business ===
Electronic business encompasses business processes spanning the entire value chain: purchasing, supply chain management, marketing, sales, customer service, and business relationship. E-commerce seeks to add revenue streams using the internet to build and enhance relationships with clients and partners. According to International Data Corporation, the size of worldwide e-commerce, when global business-to-business and -consumer transactions are combined, equate to $16 trillion in 2013. A report by Oxford Economics added those two together to estimate the total size of the digital economy at $20.4 trillion, equivalent to roughly 13.8% of global sales.

While much has been written of the economic advantages of internet-enabled commerce, there is also evidence that some aspects of the internet such as maps and location-aware services may serve to reinforce economic inequality and the digital divide. Electronic commerce may be responsible for consolidation and the decline of mom-and-pop, brick and mortar businesses resulting in increases in income inequality.

A 2013 Institute for Local Self-Reliance report states that brick-and-mortar retailers employ 47 people for every $10 million in sales, while Amazon employs only 14. Similarly, the 700-employee room rental start-up Airbnb was valued at $10 billion in 2014, about half as much as Hilton Worldwide, which employs 152,000 people. At that time, Uber employed 1,000 full-time employees and was valued at $18.2 billion, about the same valuation as Avis Rent a Car and The Hertz Corporation combined, which together employed almost 60,000 people.

Advertising on popular web pages can be lucrative, and e-commerce. Online advertising is a form of marketing and advertising which uses the internet to deliver promotional marketing messages to consumers. It includes email marketing, search engine marketing (SEM), social media marketing, many types of display advertising (including web banner advertising), and mobile advertising. In 2011, internet advertising revenues in the United States surpassed those of cable television and nearly exceeded those of broadcast television. Many common online advertising practices are controversial and increasingly subject to regulation.

=== Politics ===
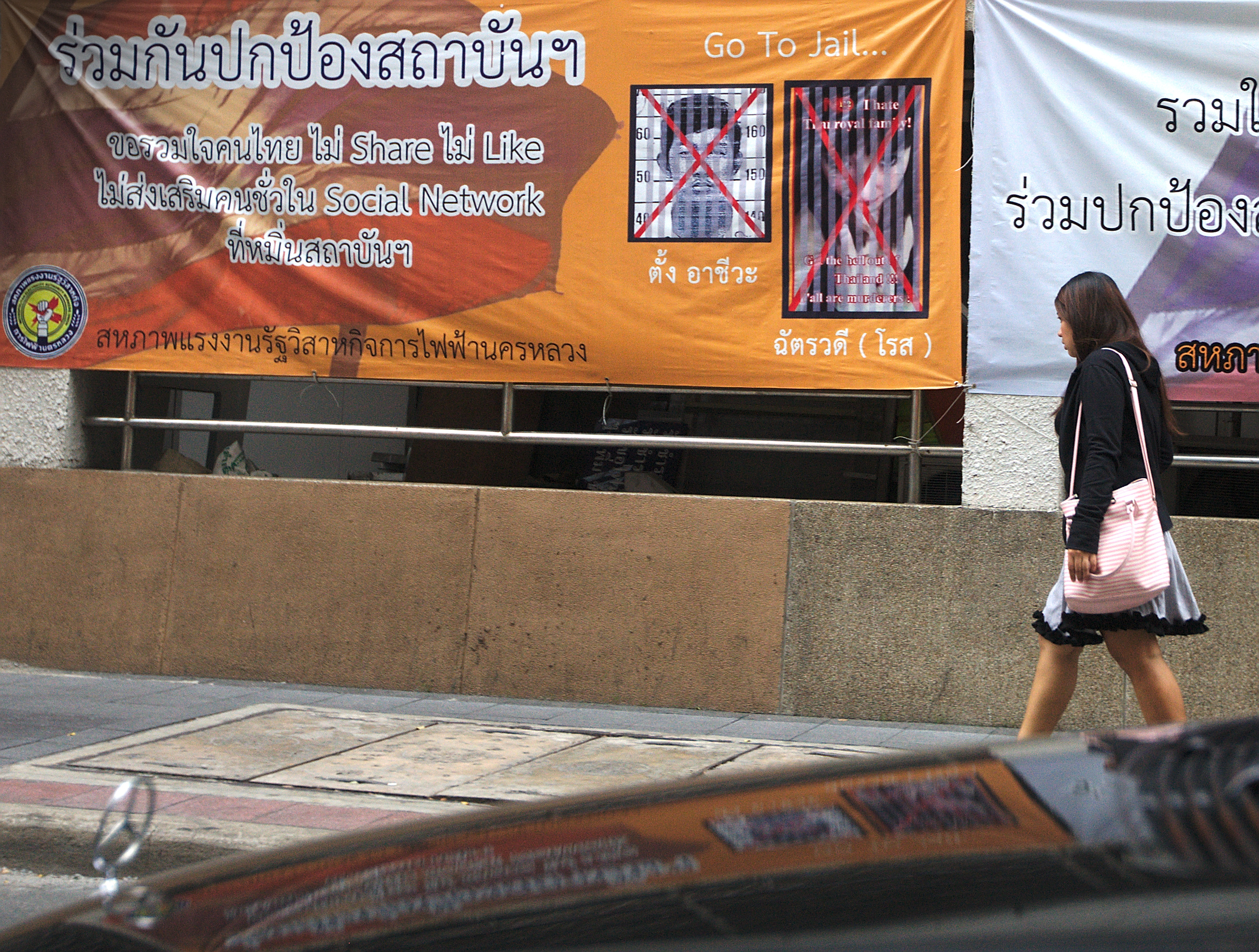
Banner in Bangkok during the 2014 Thai coup d'état, informing the Thai public that 'like' or 'share' activities on social media could result in imprisonment (observed 30 June 2014)

The internet has achieved new relevance as a political tool. The presidential campaign of Howard Dean in 2004 in the United States was notable for its success in soliciting donation via the internet. Many political groups use the internet to achieve a new method of organizing for carrying out their mission, having given rise to internet activism. Social media websites, such as Facebook and Twitter, helped people organize the Arab Spring, by helping activists organize protests, communicate grievances, and disseminate information.

Many have understood the internet as an extension of the Habermasian notion of the public sphere, observing how network communication technologies provide something like a global civic forum. However, incidents of politically motivated internet censorship have now been recorded in many countries, including western democracies.

E-government is the use of technological communications devices, such as the internet, to provide public services to citizens and other persons in a country or region. E-government offers opportunities for more direct and convenient citizen access to government and for government provision of services directly to citizens.

=== Religion and terrorism ===
Cybersectarianism is a new organizational form that involves:

highly dispersed small groups of practitioners that may remain largely anonymous within the larger social context and operate in relative secrecy, while still linked remotely to a larger network of believers who share a set of practices and texts, and often a common devotion to a particular leader. Overseas supporters provide funding and support; domestic practitioners distribute tracts, participate in acts of resistance, and share information on the internal situation with outsiders. Collectively, members and practitioners of such sects construct viable virtual communities of faith, exchanging personal testimonies and engaging in the collective study via email, online chat rooms, and web-based message boards.

In particular, the British government has raised concerns about the prospect of young British Muslims being indoctrinated into Islamic extremism by material on the internet, being persuaded to join terrorist groups such as the so-called "Islamic State", and then potentially committing acts of terrorism on returning to Britain after fighting in Syria or Iraq.

== Applications and services ==
The internet carries many applications and services, most prominently the World Wide Web, including social media, electronic mail, mobile applications, multiplayer online games, internet telephony, file sharing, and streaming media services.

=== World Wide Web ===
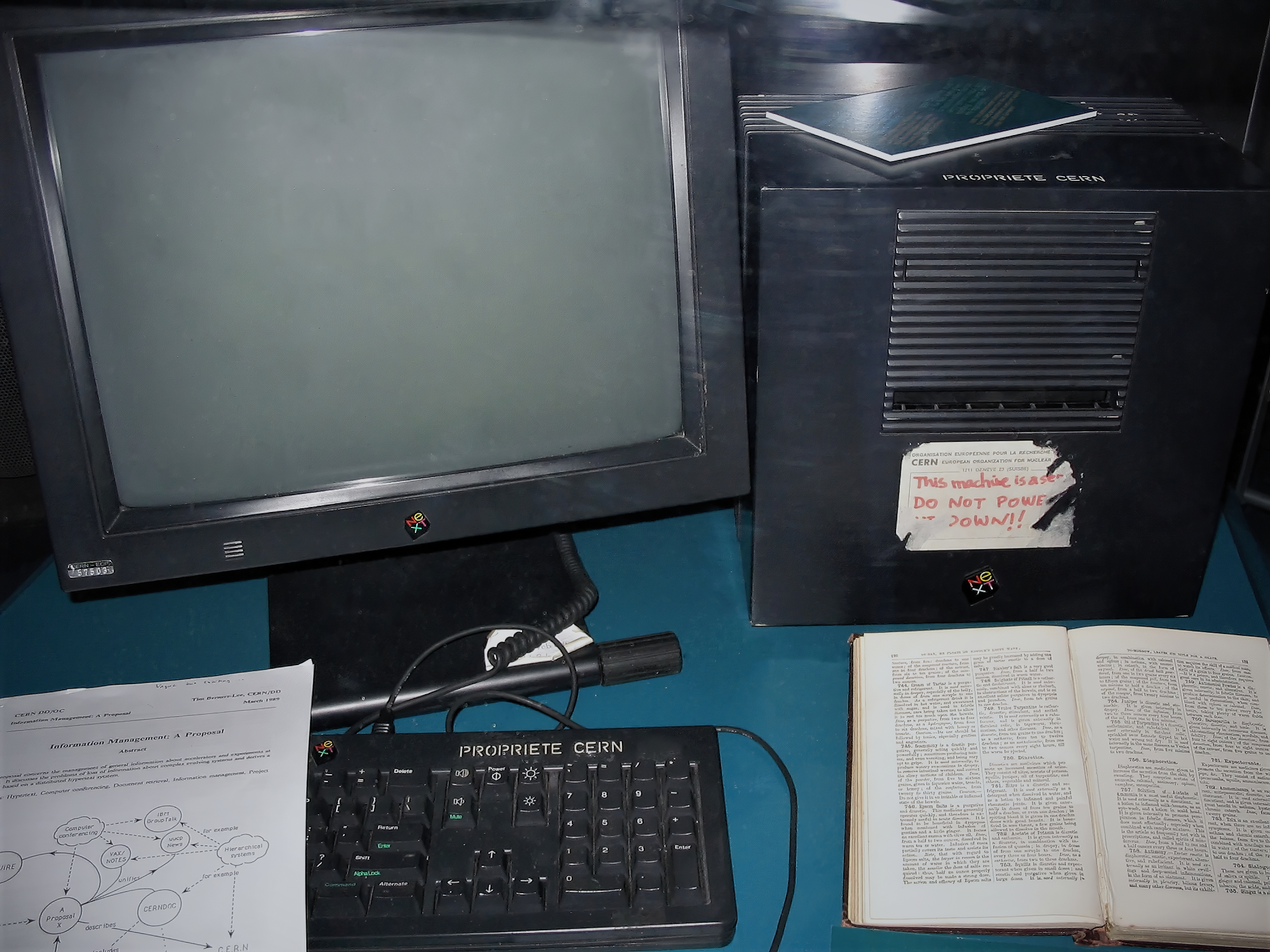
This NeXT Computer was used by Tim Berners-Lee at CERN and became the world's first Web server.

The World Wide Web is a global collection of documents, images, multimedia, applications, and other resources, logically interrelated by hyperlinks and referenced with Uniform Resource Identifiers (URIs), which provide a global system of named references. URIs symbolically identify services, web servers, databases, and the documents and resources that they can provide.

HyperText Transfer Protocol (HTTP) is the main access protocol of the World Wide Web. Web services also use HTTP for communication between software systems for information transfer, sharing and exchanging business data and logistics and is one of many languages or protocols that can be used for communication on the internet.

World Wide Web browser software, such as Microsoft Edge, Mozilla Firefox, Opera, Apple's Safari, and Google Chrome, enable users to navigate from one web page to another via the hyperlinks embedded in the documents. These documents may also contain computer data, including graphics, sounds, text, video, multimedia and interactive content. Client-side scripts can include animations, games, office applications and scientific demonstrations.

=== Communication ===
Email is an important communications service available via the internet. The concept of sending electronic text messages between parties, analogous to mailing letters or memos, predates the creation of the internet.

Internet telephony is a common communications service realized with the internet. The name of the principal internetworking protocol, the internet Protocol, lends its name to voice over internet protocol (VoIP). VoIP systems now dominate many markets, being as easy and convenient as a traditional telephone, while having substantial cost savings, especially over long distances.

=== File sharing ===
File sharing is the practice of transferring large amounts of data in the form of computer files across the internet, for example via file servers. The load of bulk downloads to many users can be eased by the use of "mirror" servers or peer-to-peer networks.

Access to the file may be controlled by user authentication, the transit of the file over the internet may be obscured by encryption, and money may change hands for access to the file. The price can be paid by the remote charging of funds from, for example, a credit card whose details are also passed—usually fully encrypted—across the internet. The origin and authenticity of the file received may be checked by a digital signature.

== Governance ==
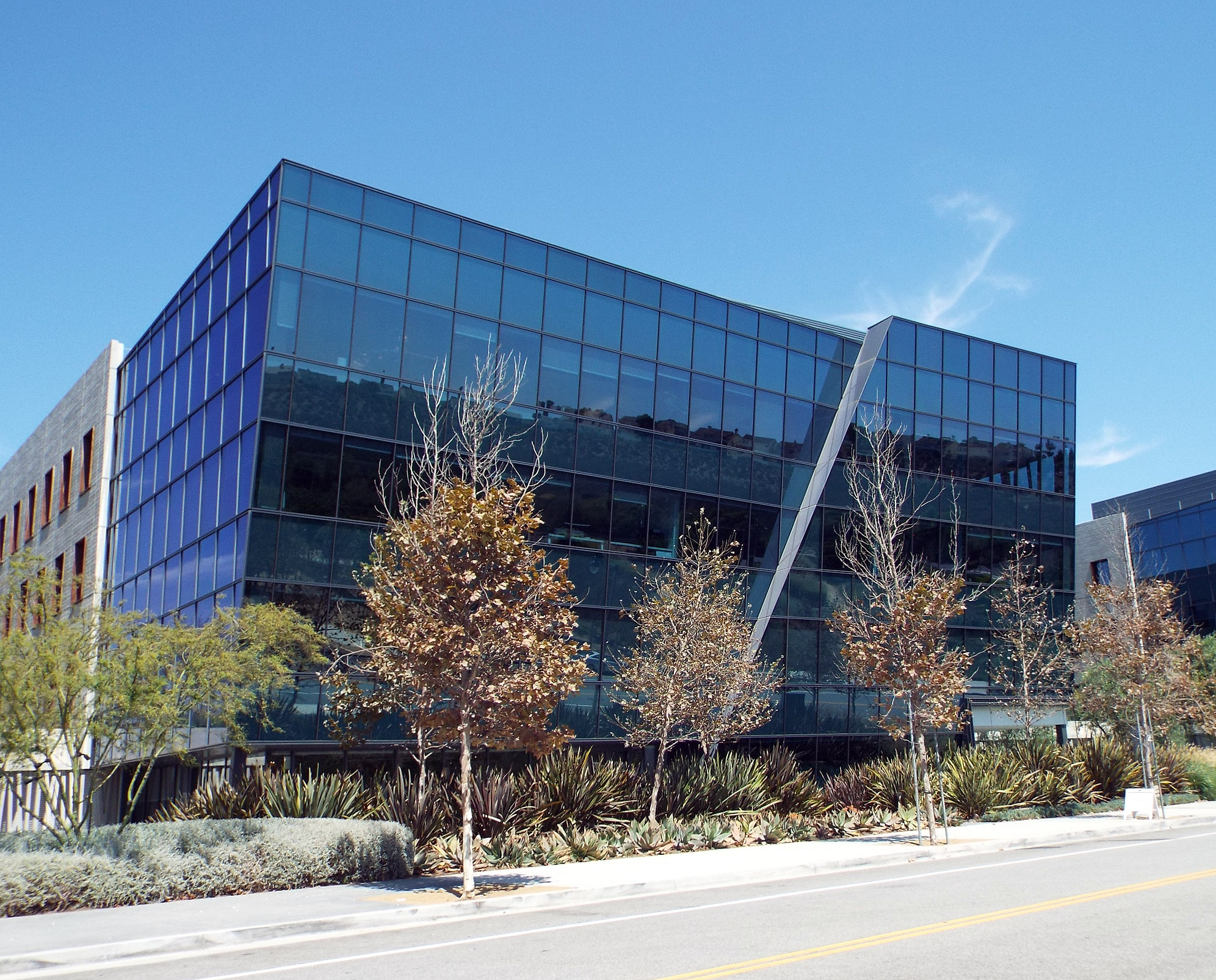
ICANN headquarters in the Playa Vista neighborhood of Los Angeles, California, United States

The internet is a global network that comprises many voluntarily interconnected autonomous networks. It operates without a central governing body.

=== IETF ===
The technical underpinning and standardization of the core protocols (IPv4 and IPv6) is an activity of the Internet Engineering Task Force (IETF), a non-profit organization of loosely affiliated international participants that anyone may associate with by contributing technical expertise.

While the hardware components in the internet infrastructure can often be used to support other software systems, it is the design and the standardization process of the software that characterizes the internet and provides the foundation for its scalability and success. The responsibility for the architectural design of the internet software systems has been assumed by the IETF.

The IETF conducts standard-setting work groups, open to any individual, about the various aspects of internet architecture. The resulting contributions and standards are published as Request for Comments (RFC) documents on the IETF web site. The principal methods of networking that enable the internet are contained in specially designated RFCs that constitute the Internet Standards. Other less rigorous documents are simply informative, experimental, or historical, or document the best current practices when implementing internet technologies.

=== ICANN ===
To maintain interoperability, the principal name spaces of the internet are administered by the Internet Corporation for Assigned Names and Numbers (ICANN). ICANN is governed by an international board of directors drawn from across the internet technical, business, academic, and other non-commercial communities. The organization coordinates the assignment of unique identifiers for use on the internet, including domain names, IP addresses, application port numbers in the transport protocols, and many other parameters. Globally unified name spaces are essential for maintaining the global reach of the internet. This role of ICANN distinguishes it as perhaps the only central coordinating body for the global internet.

The National Telecommunications and Information Administration, an agency of the United States Department of Commerce, had final approval over changes to the DNS root zone until the IANA stewardship transition on 1 October 2016.

=== Regional internet registries ===
Regional internet registries (RIRs) were established for five regions of the world to assign IP address blocks and other internet parameters to local registries, such as internet service providers, from a designated pool of addresses set aside for each region:

- The African Network Information Center (AfriNIC) for Africa
- The American Registry for Internet Numbers (ARIN) for North America
- The Asia–Pacific Network Information Centre (APNIC) for Asia and the Pacific region
- The Latin American and Caribbean Internet Addresses Registry (LACNIC) for Latin America and the Caribbean
- The Réseaux IP Européens – Network Coordination Centre (RIPE NCC) for Europe, the Middle East, and Central Asia

=== Other groups ===
The Internet Society (ISOC) was founded in 1992 with a mission to "assure the open development, evolution and use of the internet for the benefit of all people throughout the world". Its members include individuals as well as corporations, organizations, governments, and universities. Among other activities ISOC provides an administrative home for a number of less formally organized groups that are involved in developing and managing the internet, including: the Internet Engineering Task Force (IETF), Internet Architecture Board (IAB), Internet Engineering Steering Group (IESG), Internet Research Task Force (IRTF), and Internet Research Steering Group (IRSG).

On 16 November 2005, the United Nations-sponsored World Summit on the Information Society in Tunis established the Internet Governance Forum (IGF) to discuss internet-related issues.

== Infrastructure ==
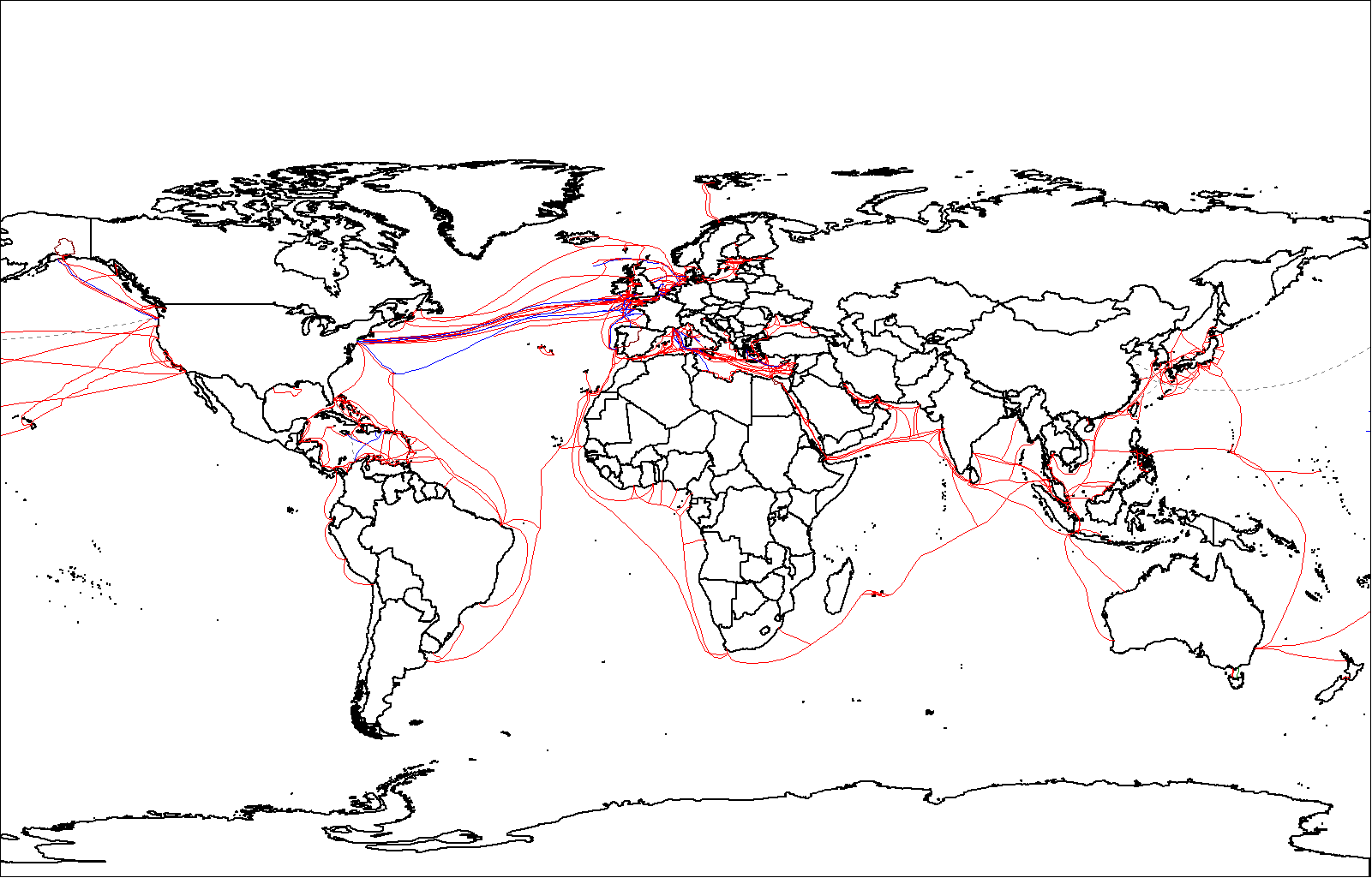
2007 map showing submarine fiberoptic telecommunication cables around the world

The communications infrastructure of the internet consists of its hardware components and a system of software layers that control various aspects of the architecture. As with any computer network, the internet physically consists of routers, media (such as cabling and radio links), repeaters, and modems. However, as an example of internetworking, many of the network nodes are not necessarily internet equipment per se. Internet packets are carried by other full-fledged networking protocols, with the internet acting as a homogeneous networking standard, running across heterogeneous hardware, with the packets guided to their destinations by IP routers.

=== Service tiers ===
Packet routing across the internet involves several tiers of internet service providers.

Internet service providers (ISPs) establish worldwide connectivity between individual networks at various levels of scope. At the top of the routing hierarchy are the tier 1 networks, large telecommunication companies that exchange traffic directly with each other via very high speed fiber-optic cables and governed by peering agreements. Tier 2 and lower-level networks buy internet transit from other providers to reach at least some parties on the global internet, though they may also engage in peering. End-users who only access the internet when needed to perform a function or obtain information, represent the bottom of the routing hierarchy.

An ISP may use a single upstream provider for connectivity, or implement multihoming to achieve redundancy and load balancing. Internet exchange points are major traffic exchanges with physical connections to multiple ISPs. Large organizations, such as academic institutions, large enterprises, and governments, may perform the same function as ISPs, engaging in peering and purchasing transit on behalf of their internal networks. Research networks tend to interconnect with large subnetworks such as GEANT, GLORIAD, Internet2, and the UK's national research and education network, JANET.

=== Access ===
Common methods of internet access by users include broadband over coaxial cable, fiber optics or copper wires, Wi-Fi, satellite, and cellular telephone technology. Grassroots efforts have led to wireless community networks. Commercial Wi-Fi services that cover large areas are available in many cities, such as New York, London, Vienna, Toronto, San Francisco, Philadelphia, Chicago and Pittsburgh.

=== Data centers ===
Most servers that provide internet services are today hosted in data centers, and content is often accessed through high-performance content delivery networks.

Colocation centers often host private peering connections between their customers, internet transit providers, internet service providers, cloud providers, meet-me rooms for connecting customers together, internet exchange points, and landing points and terminal equipment for fiber optic submarine communication cables, connecting the internet.

== Internet Protocol Suite ==
The internet standards describe a framework known as the internet protocol suite (also called TCP/IP, based on the first two components.) This is a suite of protocols that are ordered into a set of four conceptional layers by the scope of their operation, originally documented in RFC 1122 and RFC 1123:

- At the top is the application layer, where communication is described in terms of the objects or data structures most appropriate for each application. For example, a web browser operates in a client–server application model and exchanges information with the HyperText Transfer Protocol (HTTP) and an application-germane data structure, such as the HyperText Markup Language (HTML).
- Below this top layer, the transport layer connects applications on different hosts with a logical channel through the network. It provides this service with a variety of possible characteristics, such as ordered, reliable delivery (TCP), and an unreliable datagram service (UDP).
- Underlying these layers are the networking technologies that interconnect networks at their borders and exchange traffic across them. The internet layer implements the internet protocol (IP) which enables computers to identify and locate each other by IP address and route their traffic via intermediate transit networks. The IP layer code is independent of the type of network that it is physically running over.
- At the bottom of the architecture is the link layer, which connects nodes on the same physical link, and contains protocols that do not require routers for traversal to other links. The protocol suite does not explicitly specify hardware methods to transfer bits, or protocols to manage such hardware, but assumes that appropriate technology is available. Examples of that technology include Wi-Fi, Ethernet, and DSL.

As user data is processed through the protocol stack, each abstraction layer adds encapsulation information at the sending host. Data is transmitted over the wire at the link level between hosts and routers. Encapsulation is removed by the receiving host. Intermediate relays update link encapsulation at each hop, and inspect the IP layer for routing purposes.

=== Internet protocol ===
Conceptual data flow in a simple network topology of two hosts (A and B) connected by a link between their respective routers. The application on each host executes read and write operations as if the processes were directly connected to each other by some kind of data pipe. After the establishment of this pipe, most details of the communication are hidden from each process, as the underlying principles of communication are implemented in the lower protocol layers.

The most prominent component of the internet model is the internet protocol. IP enables internetworking, essentially establishing the internet itself. Two versions of the internet protocol exist, IPv4 and IPv6. Aside from the complex array of physical connections that make up its infrastructure, the Internet is facilitated by bi- or multi-lateral commercial contracts (e.g., peering agreements), and by technical specifications or protocols that describe the exchange of data over the network.

==== IP Addresses ====
A DNS resolver consults three name servers to resolve the domain name user-visible "www.wikipedia.org" to determine the IPv4 Address 207.142.131.234.

For locating individual computers on the network, the Internet provides IP addresses. IP addresses are used by the internet infrastructure to direct internet packets to their destinations. They consist of fixed-length numbers, which are found within the packet. IP addresses are generally assigned to equipment either automatically via Dynamic Host Configuration Protocol, or are configured.

Domain Name Systems convert user-inputted domain names (e.g. "en.wikipedia.org") into IP addresses.

==== IPv4 ====
Internet Protocol version 4 (IPv4) defines an IP address as a 32-bit number. IPv4 is the initial version used on the first generation of the internet and is still in dominant use. It was designed in 1981 to address up to ≈4.3 billion (10^{9}) hosts. However, the explosive growth of the internet has led to IPv4 address exhaustion, which entered its final stage in 2011, when the global IPv4 address allocation pool was exhausted.

==== IPv6 ====
Because of the growth of the internet and the depletion of available IPv4 addresses, a new version of IP IPv6, was developed in the mid-1990s, which provides vastly larger addressing capabilities and more efficient routing of internet traffic. IPv6 uses 128 bits for the IP address and was standardized in 1998. IPv6 deployment has been ongoing since the mid-2000s and is currently in growing deployment around the world, since internet address registries began to urge all resource managers to plan rapid adoption and conversion.

By design, IPv6 is not directly interoperable with IPv4. Instead, it establishes a parallel version of the internet not directly accessible with IPv4 software. Thus, translation facilities exist for internetworking, and some nodes have duplicate networking software for both networks. Essentially all modern computer operating systems support both versions of the internet protocol. Network infrastructure, however, has been lagging in this development.

==== Subnets ====
Creating a subnet by dividing the host identifier

A subnet or subnetwork is a logical subdivision of an IP network. Computers that belong to a subnet are addressed with an identical most-significant bit-group in their IP addresses. This results in the logical division of an IP address into two fields, the network number or routing prefix and the rest field or host identifier. The rest field is an identifier for a specific host or network interface.

The routing prefix may be expressed in Classless Inter-Domain Routing (CIDR) notation written as the first address of a network, followed by a slash character (/), and ending with the bit-length of the prefix. For example, 198.51.100.0/24 is the prefix of the internet protocol version 4 network starting at the given address, having 24 bits allocated for the network prefix, and the remaining 8 bits reserved for host addressing. Addresses in the range 198.51.100.0 to 198.51.100.255 belong to this network. The IPv6 address specification 2001:db8::/32 is a large address block with 2^{96} addresses, having a 32-bit routing prefix.

For IPv4, a network may also be characterized by its subnet mask or netmask, which is the bitmask that when applied by a bitwise AND operation to any IP address in the network, yields the routing prefix. Subnet masks are also expressed in dot-decimal notation like an address. For example, 255.255.255.0 is the subnet mask for the prefix 198.51.100.0/24.

==== Routing ====
Computers and routers use routing tables in their operating system to forward IP packets to reach a node on a different subnetwork. Routing tables are maintained by manual configuration or automatically by routing protocols. End-nodes typically use a default route that points toward an ISP providing transit, while ISP routers use the Border Gateway Protocol to establish the most efficient routing across the complex connections of the global internet.

The default gateway is the node that serves as the forwarding host (router) to other networks when no other route specification matches the destination IP address of a packet.

== Security ==
Internet resources, hardware, and software components are the target of criminal or malicious attempts to gain unauthorized control to cause interruptions, commit fraud, engage in blackmail or access private information.

=== Malware ===
Malware is malicious software used and distributed via the internet. It includes computer viruses which are copied with the help of humans, computer worms which copy themselves automatically, software for denial of service attacks, ransomware, botnets, and spyware that reports on the activity and typing of users. Usually, these activities constitute cybercrime. Defense theorists have also speculated about the possibilities of hackers using cyber warfare using similar methods on a large scale.

Malware poses serious problems to individuals and businesses on the internet. According to Symantec's 2018 Internet Security Threat Report (ISTR), malware variants number has increased to 669,947,865 in 2017, which is twice as many malware variants as in 2016. Cybercrime, which includes malware attacks as well as other crimes committed by computer, was predicted to cost the world economy US$6 trillion in 2021, and is increasing at a rate of 15% per year. Since 2021, malware has been designed to target computer systems that run critical infrastructure such as the electricity distribution network. Malware can be designed to evade antivirus software detection algorithms.

=== Surveillance ===
The vast majority of computer surveillance involves the monitoring of data and traffic on the internet. In the United States for example, under the Communications Assistance For Law Enforcement Act, all phone calls and broadband internet traffic (emails, web traffic, instant messaging, etc.) are required to be available for unimpeded real-time monitoring by Federal law enforcement agencies. Under the Act, all U.S. telecommunications providers are required to install packet sniffing technology to allow Federal law enforcement and intelligence agencies to intercept all of their customers' broadband internet and VoIP traffic. (Note: Packet capture is the monitoring of data traffic on a computer network. A packet capture appliance intercepts these packets as they are traveling through the network, in order to examine their contents using other programs. Other programs are needed to perform traffic analysis and sift through intercepted data looking for important/useful information.)

The large amount of data gathered from packet capture requires surveillance software that filters and reports relevant information, such as the use of certain words or phrases, the access to certain types of web sites, or communicating via email or chat with certain parties. Agencies, such as the Information Awareness Office, NSA, GCHQ and the FBI, spend billions of dollars per year to develop, purchase, implement, and operate systems for interception and analysis of data. Similar systems are operated by Iranian secret police to identify and suppress dissidents. The required hardware and software were allegedly installed by German Siemens and Finnish Nokia.

=== Censorship ===
Internet censorship and surveillance by country (2018) (Note: Due to legal concerns the OpenNet Initiative does not check for filtering of child pornography and because their classifications focus on technical filtering, they do not include other types of censorship.): Pervasive Substantial / Selective Little or none; Unclassified / No data

Some governments, such as those of Myanmar, Iran, North Korea, Mainland China, Saudi Arabia and the United Arab Emirates, restrict access to content on the internet within their territories, especially to political and religious content, with domain name and keyword filters.

In Norway, Denmark, Finland, and Sweden, major internet service providers have voluntarily agreed to restrict access to sites listed by authorities. While this list of forbidden resources is supposed to contain only known child pornography sites, the content of the list is secret.

Many countries, including the United States, have enacted laws against the possession or distribution of certain material, such as child pornography, via the internet but do not mandate filter software. Many free or commercially available software programs, called content-control software are available to users to block offensive specific on individual computers or networks in order to limit access by children to pornographic material or depiction of violence.

== Performance ==
As the internet is a heterogeneous network, its physical characteristics, including, for example the data transfer rates of connections, vary widely. It exhibits emergent phenomena that depend on its large-scale organization.

=== Traffic volume ===
Raw data

The volume of internet traffic is difficult to measure because no single point of measurement exists in the multi-tiered, non-hierarchical topology. Traffic data may be estimated from the aggregate volume through the peering points of the Tier 1 network providers, but traffic that stays local in large provider networks may not be accounted for.

=== Outages ===
An internet blackout or outage can be caused by local signaling interruptions. Disruptions of submarine communications cables may cause blackouts or slowdowns to large areas, such as in the 2008 submarine cable disruption. Less-developed countries are more vulnerable due to the small number of high-capacity links. Land cables are also vulnerable, as in 2011 when a woman digging for scrap metal severed most connectivity for the nation of Armenia. Internet blackouts affecting almost entire countries can be achieved by governments as a form of internet censorship, as in the blockage of the internet in Egypt, whereby approximately 93% of networks were without access in 2011 in an attempt to stop mobilization for anti-government protests.

=== Energy use ===
Estimates of the internet's electricity usage have been the subject of controversy, according to a 2014 peer-reviewed research paper that found claims differing by a factor of 20,000 published in the literature during the preceding decade, ranging from 0.0064 kilowatt hours per gigabyte transferred (kWh/GB) to 136 kWh/GB. The researchers attributed these discrepancies mainly to the year of reference (i.e. whether efficiency gains over time had been taken into account) and to whether "end devices such as personal computers and servers are included" in the analysis.

In 2011, academic researchers estimated the overall energy used by the internet to be between 170 and 307 GW, less than two percent of the energy used by humanity. This estimate included the energy needed to build, operate, and periodically replace the estimated 750 million laptops, a billion smart phones and 100 million servers worldwide as well as the energy that routers, cell towers, optical switches, Wi-Fi transmitters and cloud storage devices use when transmitting internet traffic. According to a non-peer-reviewed study published in 2018 by The Shift Project (a French think tank funded by corporate sponsors), nearly 4% of global CO_{2} emissions could be attributed to global data transfer and the necessary infrastructure. The study also said that online video streaming alone accounted for 60% of this data transfer and therefore contributed to over 300 million tons of CO_{2} emission per year, and argued for new "digital sobriety" regulations restricting the use and size of video files.

== See also ==
- Crowdfunding
- Crowdsourcing
- Cyberspace
- Darknet
- Deep web
- Hyphanet (aka Freenet)
- Internet industry jargon
- Index of Internet-related articles
- Internet metaphors
- Internet video
- "Internets"
- Outline of the internet
- Timeline of the history of the internet

== Sources ==
- This article incorporates text from a free content work. Text taken from World Trends in Freedom of Expression and Media Development Global Report 2017/2018, 202, UNESCO.
- Abbate, Janet (1999). Inventing the Internet. Cambridge, Massachusetts: MIT Press. ISBN 978-0-262-01172-3.
