= Capitalization in English =

Conventions and use of capital letters

The capital letter "A" in the Latin alphabet followed by its lower case equivalent.

Capitalization or capitalisation in English is the use of a capital letter at the start of an English word. English usage varies from capitalization in other languages.

== History of English capitalization ==
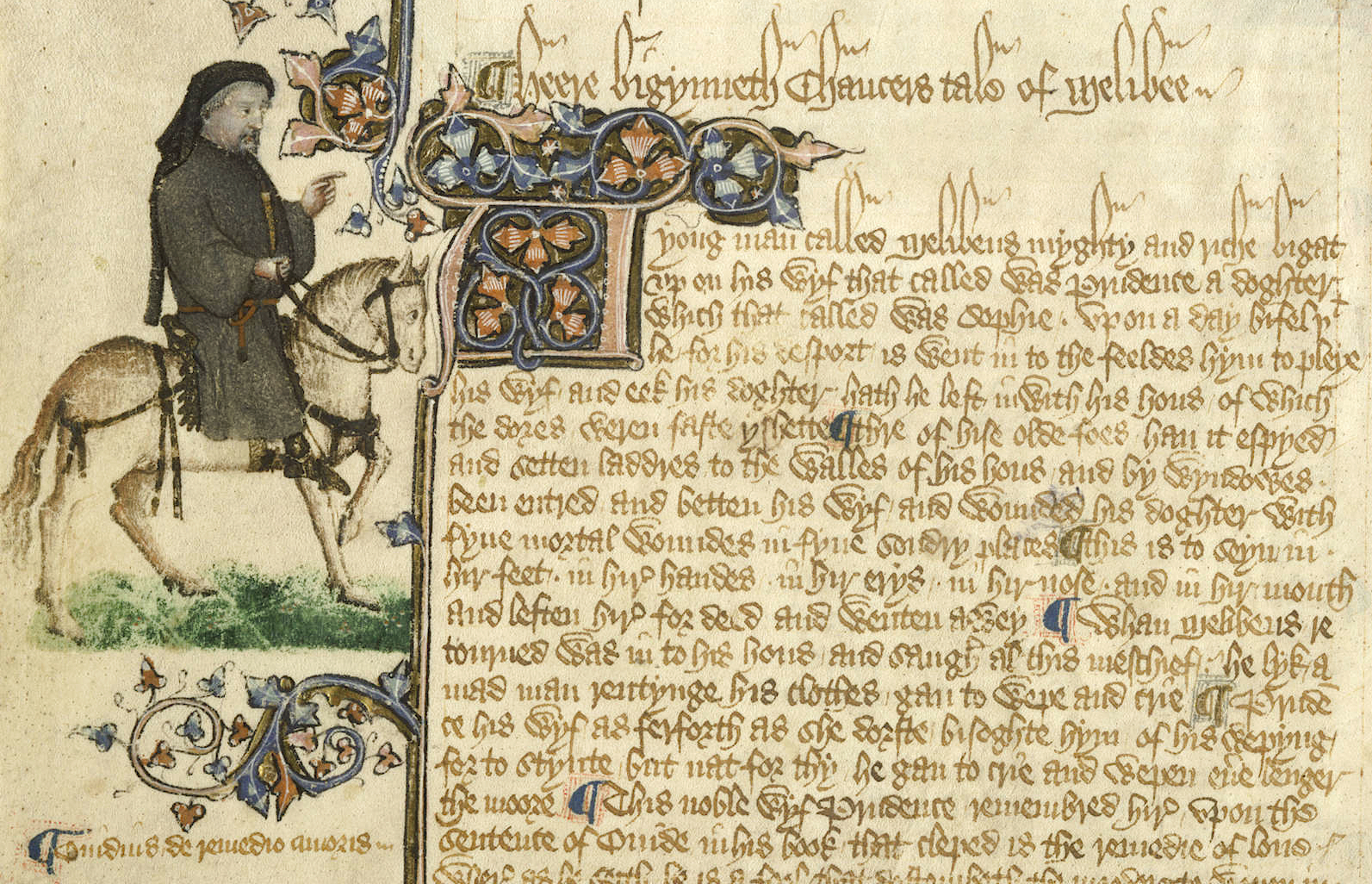
Capitalization in Chaucer's Canterbury Tales (Ellesmere Manuscript, about 1400)

Old English did not always make a distinction between uppercase and lowercase, and at best had embossed or decorated letters indicating sections. Middle English capitalization in manuscripts remained haphazard, and was often done for visual aesthetics more than grammar; in poetry, the first letter of each line or verse is often capitalized. With the development of the printing press in Europe and England, the capitalization of initial letters and proper nouns became more regularized, perhaps partly to distinguish new sentences in a time where punctuation remained sparse and irregularly used. The plays of Shakespeare show capitalization both of new lines and sentences, proper nouns, and some significant common nouns and verbs.

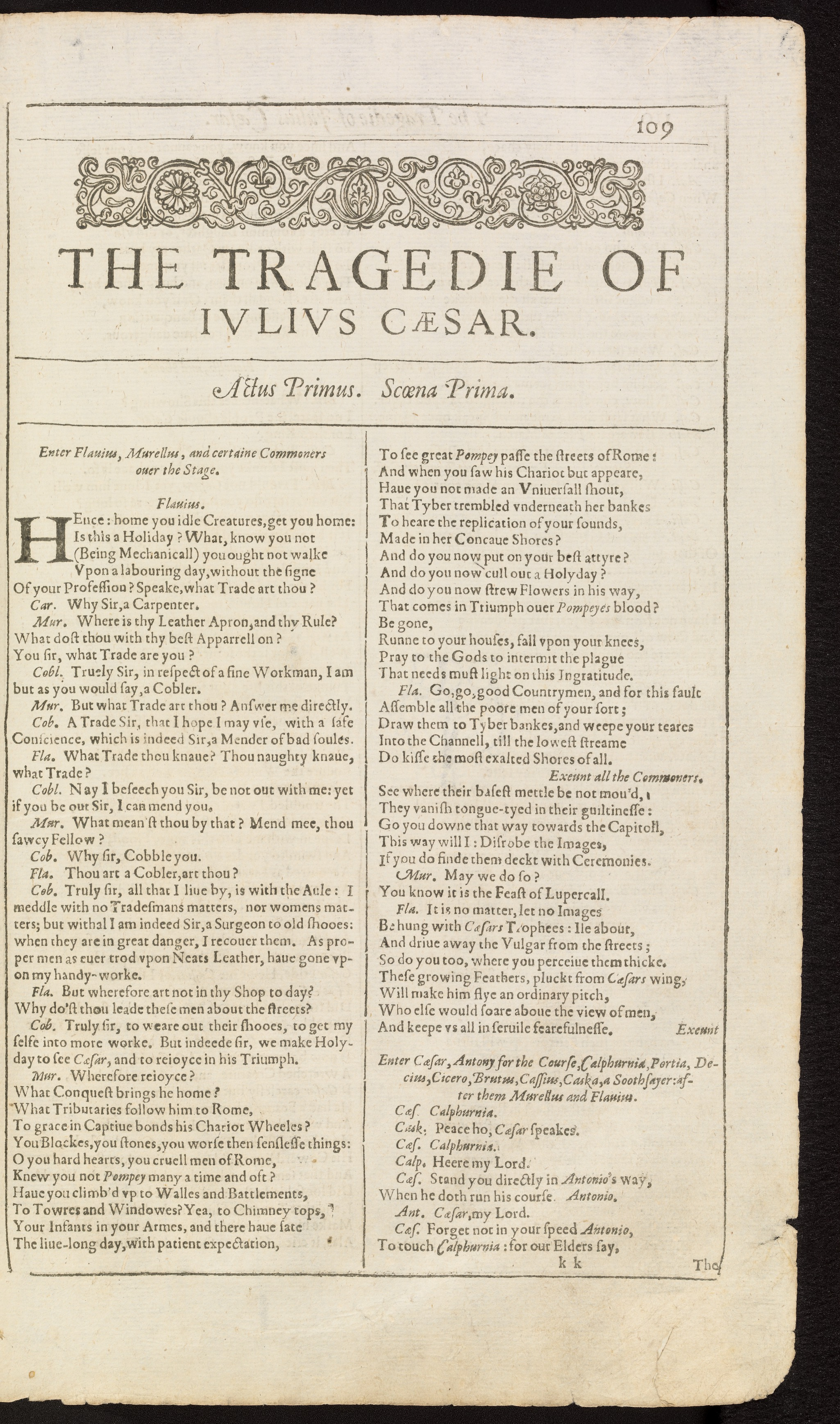
Capitalization in Shakespeare's Julius Caesar (Bodleian First Folio)

By the era of Early Modern English, with the influence of continental printing practices after the English Restoration in 1660, printing began to favor increased capitalization of nouns following German typography. The first lines of the U.S. Constitution of 1787 show major capitalization of most nouns:

We the People of the United States, in Order to form a more perfect Union, establish Justice, ensure domestic Tranquility, provide for the common defence, promote the general Welfare, and secure the Blessings of Liberty to ourselves and our Posterity, do ordain and establish this Constitution for the United States of America.

By the end of the 18th century, with the growth of prescriptive dictionaries and style manuals for English usage, the practice faded in Britain. By the beginning of the 19th century, common nouns were only occasionally capitalized, such as in advertisements. The style lasted as late as the Civil War era in the United States; some of Emily Dickinson's poems still capitalize many common nouns.

== When to capitalize ==
Capital letters are used:

1. at the beginning of a sentence. In printing this is known as sentence case, where the first letter of the sentence is capitalized, and all others are lower case with the exception of proper nouns. In printing, normal sentence case may be substituted by UPPER CASE or "all caps" (all letters are capitalized), and Title Case (where the first letter of each word is capitalized). Capitals are sometimes used and sometimes not used after a colon, although they are used in some citation systems such as APA style when beginning an independent clause.
2. with some nouns, pronouns and adjectives, usually if a noun indicates a proper noun.
  - pronoun "I". One theory for this unusual usage is that in early printing lowercase i was confused with words using i as a past participle marker or first letter.
  - personal and place names: "John", "Mr. Smith", "Amsterdam", "Europe", "Mount Everest", "the Ganges".
  - compass directions when referring to geographical regions: "Western Canada", "I was raised in the South", but not for points on a compass: "London is west of Berlin".
  - nouns and adjectives referring to races, tribes, nationalities, and languages: "Arabic", "Inuit", "French" but "Black" and "White" can be capitalized or not capitalized.
  - national and regional adjectives: "an American" (noun), "an American man" (adjective).
  - school subjects and courses: "He passed History this term", "She is taking Chemistry 101".
  - religions: "an Anglican curate", "a Catholic church" (adjective), but not "a catholic diet" in which catholic simply means "all-encompassing" or "universal."
  - the Supreme Being, deities and personifications: "God", "Providence", "Fame".
  - reverential pronouns: "His, Him" when referring to God or Christ.
  - days and months: "Monday", "January", but not seasons such as "autumn".
  - brand names: "Toyota", "Nike", "Coca-Cola", unless the brand itself is purposely not capitalized or unusually capitalized: "iPhone", "eBay".
  - royal titles: "King George III" but "kings and queens of England", but only sometimes 'sir' or 'madam'.
  - planets and other celestial bodies: "Jupiter", "the Crab Nebula"; and "the Earth", "the Sun", or "the Moon" should be capitalized according to the International Astronomical Union based on its manual of style, but style guides may suggest differently.
  - words which change their meaning between capitalized and uncapitalized usage, such as "liberal" and "Liberal", are called capitonyms: Compare "A man of liberal tastes" and "The leader of the Liberal Party" (as with "catholic" above).
  - in legal documents, where the full name of an individual or body is later referred to in short form, in order to avoid ambiguity: "John Smith (the Plaintiff)", "Exxon-Mobil Corporation (the Company)".

=== Title capitalization in different styles ===
Depending on which style guide is used for capitalization, certain rules regarding specific words, such as prepositions, nouns, and pronouns, apply. In titles, the following words need to be capitalized according to each of the following style guides:

==== American Psychological Association ====
APA style is a "down" style, meaning that words are lowercase unless there is specific guidance to capitalize them such as words beginning a sentence; proper nouns and trade names; job titles and positions; diseases, disorders, therapies, theories, and related terms; titles of works and headings within works; titles of tests and measures; nouns followed by numerals or letters; names of conditions or groups in an experiment; and names of study factors, variables, and effects.

==== Modern Language Association ====
- Capitalize words that are four letters or longer.
- Capitalize nouns, verbs, adjectives, adverbs, and pronouns.
- Capitalize the second part of hyphenated words.

==== Chicago Manual of Style ====
- Capitalize nouns, pronouns, adjectives, verbs, adverbs, and subordinating conjunctions.
- Lowercase articles (a, an, the), coordinating conjunctions, and prepositions.

==== Associated Press (AP) ====
- Capitalize words with three or more letters.
- Capitalize nouns, pronouns, adjectives, verbs, adverbs, and subordinating conjunctions.
- Lowercase articles (a, an, the), coordinating conjunctions, and prepositions.

=== Capitalization of multi-word place names, institutions, and titles of works ===
English usage is not consistent, but generally prepositions and articles are not capitalized: "the Forest of Dean", "Gone with the Wind", "University of Southampton". With some publications "The" forms part of the title: "reading The Times". For a more detailed explanation see Capitalization § Titles.

=== Capitalization of acronyms and initialisms ===
Generally acronyms and initialisms are capitalized, e.g., "NASA" or "SOS". Sometimes, a minor word such as a preposition is not capitalized within the acronym, such as "WoW" for "World of Warcraft". In some British English style guides, only the initial letter of an acronym is capitalized if the acronym is read as a word, e.g., "Nasa" or "Unesco."

== See also ==
- Capitalization
- All caps (used to shout, and on some signage)
- Alternating caps (used to express a sarcastic or mocking tone)
- Capitalization of Internet
- Letter case: Headings and publication titles
