= Internet industry jargon =

Jargon used by workers in the Internet industry

Internet industry jargon is a unique way of speaking used by people working in the internet industry. It shows how those people talk and communicate with each other in their work setting and can vary with different language cultures in different countries. The jargon consists of familiar words found in daily life, but combined and used in the internet industry to create new concepts that describe and express specific ideas. Those jargons are intensively used in their speaking. It is often hard for people outside of this industry to understand what they are talking about although every word seems familiar.

== Creation and development ==
In the Information Age era of technology, the internet industry develops at a very fast pace. As the industry's dominance has expanded, so have their vocabularies. The startup ecosystem is rife with buzzwords and the language of the industry has also become trendy in the corporate world. Internet industry jargon represents the mindset of people in this industry. It was used to express more specifically and make group identification. Sometimes people in this industry use those jargons to show how professional and high-end their ideas are by using these esoteric words.

== Examples and definitions ==
Internet industry jargon itself carries the language habit and cultural background from which it develops. The following list covers some examples of the internet industry jargon, their definitions, and example of usages in English-speaking countries and China. This list is not exhaustive and is subject to change with the renewal of the social environment and usage.

Jargon	Definition	Example
X for Y	A way entrepreneurs use to describe their startup to customers and investors so they can quickly grasp how their product works. It is done by comparing your startup to another successful company that likely pioneered its business model.	"My startup is Airbnb for cars." = "People can borrow your car when you are not using it."
Acqui-hire	To buy out (a company) primarily for the skills and expertise of its staff, rather than for its products or services.	"The start-ups are being acquihired in a bid to harvest their talent"
Freemium	A strategy used by startups to make money by making their products free and shoving as many people through the top of a funnel as possible and hoping some of them convert into paid users.	"Right now, we have a shitty product that nobody will pay for. Let's release it for free so at least somebody will use it and then we can gradually improve it and charge them for extra services."
Eat your own dog food	A colloquial expression that describes a company using its own products or services for its internal operations.	
Unicorn	A startup that's worth more than one billion dollars.	"Slack's a real unicorn. They're only three years old and they're worth over three billion dollars."
Handrail	A way to describe capabilities and qualities that have core competitiveness	"In this program, our marketing strategy don't have enough handrails"
Bodysense	A way to describe personal perception, feedback, and evaluation of a project or event.	"I have no bodysense about the creativity of this project, and the strategic direction needs to be optimized."
Granularity	Used to describe the degree of refinement of something, can be the implementation of the plan, implementation rules, etc.	"The PPT granularity of this implementation project is not fine enough and needs to be further refined."
Align...with...	Project members communicate with each other to obtain equal and synchronized information.	"We just joined the project and needed to align our resources with the media team."
Energize	To achieve project objectives through helpers like media, product, organizational structure.	"In the propaganda process, the energized effect of the WeChat mini program is significant."
Closed loop	A way to describe a team can complete a complete set of business logic without any outside help.	"We can complete the business closed loop from research and development to listing, promotion, and sales"
Replay	A very detailed review and summary of the completion of the project.	"We need to do a quick replay meeting on the project next week."
