= Capitalization =

Using uppercase for a word's first letter, or using uppercase at all

The capital letter "A" in the Latin alphabet, followed by its lowercase equivalent, in sans serif and serif typefaces respectively

Capitalization (American English) or capitalisation (Commonwealth English) is the practice of writing a word with its first letter as a capital letter (uppercase letter) and the remaining letters in lower case, in writing systems with a case distinction. The term also may refer to the use of uppercase letters in general, or the choice between uppercase and lowercase.

The rules of capitalization vary between conventional writing systems (orthographies) and over time. The systematic use of capitalized and uncapitalized words in running text is called mixed case. There are various names for different capitalization rules, including sentence case and title case.

== Description ==
Capitalization is the practice of writing a word with its first letter as a capital letter (uppercase letter) and the remaining letters in lower case, in writing systems with a case distinction. The term also may refer to the use of uppercase letters in general, or the choice between uppercase and lowercase.

The systematic use of capitalized and uncapitalized words in running text is called mixed case.

== History ==
The rules of capitalization vary between conventional writing systems (orthographies) and over time. For instance, the full rules of capitalization in English are complicated and have changed over time, generally to capitalize fewer words; the conventions used in an 18th-century document will be unfamiliar to a modern reader of English (e.g., many common nouns were capitalized).

== Conventions ==
Orthographies have different conventions for capitalization, for example, the capitalization of titles. Conventions also vary, to a lesser extent, between different style guides. In addition to the Latin script, capitalization also affects the Armenian, Cyrillic, Georgian and Greek alphabets.

Owing to the essentially arbitrary nature of orthographic classification and the existence of variant authorities and local house styles, questionable capitalization of words is not uncommon, even in respected newspapers and magazines. Most publishers require consistency, at least within the same document, in applying a specified standard: this is described as house style.

=== Parts of speech ===
==== Pronouns ====
- In English, the subjective form of the singular first-person pronoun, "I", is capitalized, along with all its contractions such as I'll and I'm. Objective and possessive forms ("me", "my", and "mine") are not.
- Many European languages traditionally capitalize nouns and pronouns used to refer to God, including references to Jesus Christ (reverential capitals): hallowed be Thy name, look what He has done. Some English authors capitalize any word referring to God: the Lamb, the Almighty; some capitalize "Thy Name". These practices have become much less common in English in the 20th and 21st centuries.
  - In Baháʼí literature, singular and plural object, subject, and possessive forms are capitalized if referring to a Rasul, the Twelve Imams, or 'Abdu'l-Baha.
- Some languages capitalize a royal we (pluralis majestatis), such as in German.

===== 2nd-person pronouns =====
Many languages distinguish between formal and informal 2nd-person pronouns.

- In German, the formal 2nd-person plural pronoun Sie is capitalized along with all its case-forms (Ihre, Ihres, etc.), but these words are not capitalized when used as 3rd-person feminine singular or plural pronouns. Until the recent German spelling reform(s), the traditional rules (which are still widely adhered to, although not taught in schools) also capitalized the informal 2nd-person singular pronoun Du (and its derivatives, such as Dein) when used in letters or similar texts, but this is no longer required.
- Italian also capitalizes its formal pronouns, Lei and Loro, and their cases (even within words, e.g. arrivederLa "goodbye", formal). This is occasionally also done for the Dutch U, though this is formally only required when referring to a deity and may be considered archaic.
- In Spanish, the abbreviations of the pronouns usted and ustedes, Ud., Uds., Vd., and Vds., are usually written with a capital.
- In Finnish and Estonian, the second-person plural pronoun can be used when formally addressing a single person, and in writing the pronoun is sometimes capitalized as Te to indicate special regard. In a more familiar tone, one can also capitalize the second-person singular pronoun Sinä (Sina in Estonian).
- Similarly, in Russian the formal second-person pronoun Вы, and its oblique cases Вас, Вам etc., are capitalized (usually in personal correspondence); also in Bulgarian.
- Slovenian, Croatian, Serbian capitalize the formal second-person pronoun Vi along with its oblique cases (Vas, Vam, Vami) and personal pronoun (Vaš etc.) in formal correspondence. Historically, the familiar second-person pronoun ti and its cases (tebe, tebi, teboj) were capitalized as well, but new orthography prohibits such use.
- In Danish, the plural second-person pronoun, I, is capitalized, but its other forms jer and jeres are not. This distinguishes it from the preposition i ("in"). The less commonly used formal singular second-person pronoun is also capitalized in all its forms (De, Dem, Deres), distinguishing it from the otherwise identical third-person plural pronouns.
- In Norwegian, both second-person singular and plural have a capitalized alternative form (De, Dem, Deres in Bokmål; De, Dykk, Dykkar in Nynorsk) to express formality for both subject and object of a sentence, but is very rarely used in modern speech and writing.
- In formally written Polish, Czech, Slovak and Latvian, most notably in letters and e-mails, all pronouns referring to the addressee are capitalized. This includes Ty ("thou") and all its related forms such as Twój and Ciebie. This principle extends to nouns used formally to address the addressee of a letter, such as Pan ("sir") and Pani ("madam").
- In Indonesian, capitalizing the formal second-person pronoun Anda along with all references to the addressee, such as "(kepada) Bapak/Ibu" ((to) Sir/Madam), is required in practice of Ejaan Yang Disempurnakan (Perfected Orthography). However, some people do not know of or choose not to adhere to this spelling rule. In contrast, Malay orthography used in Malaysia, Singapore and Brunei does not require the capitalization of anda.
- In Tagalog and its standard form, Filipino, the formal second-person pronouns Kayo and Ninyo and their oblique form Inyo are customarily and reverentially capitalized as such, particularly in most digital and printed media related to religion and its references. Purists who consider this rule as nonstandard and inconsistent do not apply it when writing.
- In Tajik, capitalization is used to distinguish the second-person formal pronoun Шумо from the second-person plural pronoun шумо.
- In Swedish, since du-reformen, the second-person singular pronoun du may be capitalized as Du when addressed formally.

==== Nouns ====
- The various languages and dialects in the High German family, including Standard German and Luxembourgish, are the only major languages using the Latin alphabet in which all nouns (including nominalized verbs) are capitalized. This was also practiced in other Germanic languages (mainly due to German influence):
  - Danish, before the spelling reform of 1948
  - Norwegian, before the spelling reform of 1901
  - Swedish, during the 17th and 18th centuries
  - English, during the 17th and 18th centuries (as in Gulliver's Travels, and most of the original 1787 United States Constitution)
  - Some regional languages, such as Saterland Frisian
- In nearly all European languages, single-word proper nouns, including personal names, are capitalized (like France or Moses). Multiple-word proper nouns usually follow the traditional English rules for publication titles (as in Robert the Bruce).
  - Where place names are merely preceded by the definite article, this is usually in lower case (as in the Philippines).
    - Sometimes, the article is integral to the name, and thus is capitalized (as in Den Haag, Le Havre). However, in French this does not occur for contractions du and au (as in Je viens du Havre, "I come from Le Havre"). In other European languages, it is much more common for the article to be treated as integral to the name, but it may not be capitalized (die Schweiz, les Pays-Bas, yr Almaen, etc.).
  - A few English names are written with two lowercase "f"s: ffrench, ffoulkes, etc. This originated as a variant script for capital F.
  - A few individuals have chosen not to use capitals in their names, such as k.d. lang and bell hooks. E. E. Cummings, whose name is often written without capitals, did not do so himself: the usage derives from the typography used on the cover of one of his books.
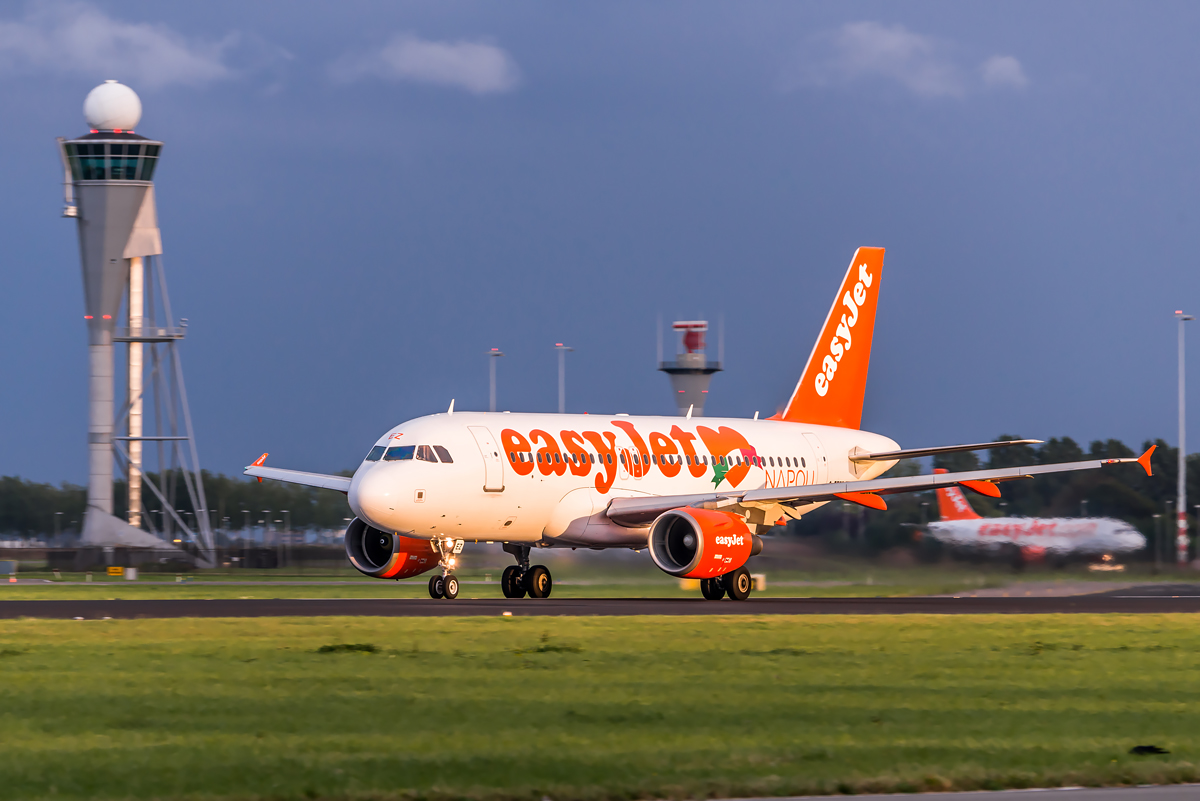
    easyJet A319 at Amsterdam Schiphol Airport.
  - Most brand names and trademarks are capitalized (e.g., Coca-Cola, Pepsi), although some have chosen to deviate from standard rules (e.g., easyJet, id Software, eBay, iPod) to be distinctive. When capitals occur within a word, it is sometimes referred to as camel case.
  - Some speakers of Eastern Slavic languages associate capitalization with respect and decapitalize proper nouns to show disrespect.
- In English, the names of days of the week, months and languages are capitalized, as are demonyms like Englishman, Arab. In other languages, practice varies, but almost all languages other than German and Luxembourgish (which capitalize all nouns) do not.
- In English-language addresses, the noun following the proper name of a street is capitalized, whether or not it is abbreviated: Main Street, Fleming Ave., Montgomery Blvd. This capitalization is often absent in older citations and in combined usages: Fourth and Main streets. In French, street names are capitalized when they are proper names; the noun itself (rue, place) is normally not capitalized: rue de Rivoli, place de la Concorde.
- In Italian the name of a particular concept or object is capitalized when the writer wants to emphasize its importance and significance.
- Capitalization is always used for most names of taxa used in scientific classification of living things, except for species-level taxa or below. Example: Homo sapiens sapiens.
- Controversially, some authors capitalize common names of some animal and plant species. As a general rule, names are not capitalized, unless they are part of an official list of names, in which case they have become proper nouns and are capitalized. This is most common for birds and fishes. Names referring to more than one species (e.g., horse or cat) are always in lower case. Botanists generally do not capitalize the common names of plants, though individual words in plant names may be capitalized for another reason: (Italian stone pine). See the discussion of official common names under common name for an explanation.
- Common nouns may be capitalized when used as names for the entire class of such things, e.g. what a piece of work is Man. Other Romance languages such as French often capitalize such nouns as l'État (the state) and l'Église (the church) when not referring to specific ones.
- Names by which gods are known are capitalized, including God, Athena, and Vishnu. The word god is generally not capitalized if it is used to refer to the generic idea of a deity, nor is it capitalized when it refers to multiple gods, e.g. Roman gods. There may be some confusion because Judaism, Christianity, and Islam rarely refer to the Deity by a specific name, but simply as God (see Writing divine names). Other names for the God of these three Abrahamic faiths, such as Elohim, Yahweh, and Lord, are also capitalized.
- While acronyms have historically been written in all-caps, British, Finnish, Swedish and some German usage has moved towards capitalizing only the first letter in cases when these are pronounced as words (e.g. Unesco and Nato), reserving all-caps for initialisms (e.g. UK, USA, UNHCR).
- In life stance orthography, in order to distinguish life stances from general -isms. For instance, Humanism is distinguished from humanism.
- In legal English, defined terms that refer to a specific entity, such as "Tenant" and "Lessor", are often capitalized. More specifically, in legal documents, terms which are formally defined elsewhere in the document or a related document (often in a schedule of definitions) are capitalized to indicate that that is the case, and may be several words long, e.g. "the Second Subsidiary Claimant", "the Agreed Conditional Release Date".
  - In contracts, particularly important clauses are often typeset as all-caps
- Most English honorifics and titles of persons, e.g. Sir, Dr Watson, Mrs Jones, His Royal Highness the Duke of Edinburgh. This does not apply where the words are not titles; e.g. Watson is a doctor, Philip is a duke.
- In very formal British English the King is referred to as The King.
- The governing body of English solicitors is correctly referred to as The Law Society. (In general any organisation may choose a name starting with a capitalized "The".)

==== Adjectives ====
- In English, adjectives derived from proper nouns (except the names of characters in fictional works) usually retain their capitalization: e.g. a Christian church, Canadian whisky, a Shakespearean sonnet, but not a quixotic mission nor malapropism. Where the original capital is no longer at the beginning of the word, usage varies: anti-Christian, and either Presocratic, pre-Socratic, Pre-Socratic or presocratic. Never preSocratic – a hyphen must precede a capital in a compound word.
- Such adjectives do not receive capitals in French (socratique, présocratique), Spanish (socrático, presocrático), Swedish (sokratisk, försokratisk), Polish (sokratejski, presokratejski) nor partly in German (sokratisch, präsokratisch, but Ohm'sches Gesetz ("Ohm's law")). In German, if the adjective becomes a noun by using an article or numeral in front of it (das/die Bunte (the colorful thing(s)), eine Schöne (a beautiful one)), it is capitalized like any other noun, as are nouns formed from proper nouns (der Urgoethe). The same applies to verbs (das Laufen (the (practice of) running), das Spazierengehen (the (practice of) going for a walk)).
- Adjectives referring to nationality or ethnicity are not capitalized in many European languages such as German, French or Czech, even though nouns are: ein kanadisches Schiff, un navire canadien, kanadská loď, a Canadian ship; ein Kanadier, un Canadien, Kanaďan, a Canadian. Both nouns and adjectives are capitalized in English when referring to nationality or ethnicity.

=== Places and geographic terms ===
The capitalization of geographic terms in English text generally depends on whether the author perceives the term as a proper noun, in which case it is capitalized, or as a combination of an established proper noun with a normal adjective or noun, in which case the latter are not capitalized. There are no universally agreed lists of English geographic terms which are considered as proper nouns. The following are examples of rules that some British and U.S. publishers have established in style guides for their authors:

- In general, the first letter is capitalized for well-defined regions, e.g. South America, Lower California, Tennessee Valley
- This general rule also applies to zones of the Earth's surface (North Temperate Zone, the Equator)
- In other cases, do not capitalize the points of the compass (north China, southeast London) or other adjectives (western Arizona, central New Mexico, upper Yangtze, lower Rio Grande)
- Capitalize generic geographic terms that are part of a place name (Atlantic Ocean, Mt. Muztagata, River Severn)
- Otherwise, do not capitalize a generic term that follows a capitalized generic term (Yangtze River valley)
- Use lower case for plurals of generic terms (Gobi and Taklamakan deserts); but "the Dakotas"
- Only capitalize "the" if it is part of the (short-form) formal place name (The Hague vs. the Netherlands, the Sudan, and the Philippines)

Upper case: East Asia, Southeast Asia, Central Asia, Central America, North Korea, South Africa, the European Union, the Republic of Poland, the North Atlantic, the Middle East, the Arctic, The Gambia, The Bahamas, The Hague

Lower case: western China, southern Beijing, western Mongolia, eastern Africa, northern North Korea, the central Gobi, the lower Yangtze River.

Abbreviated

When a term is used as a name and then subsequently a shorter term is used, then that shorter term may be used generically. If that is the case do not capitalize. ("The Tatra National Park is a tourist destination in Poland. Watch out for bears when visiting the national park.")

=== By context ===
- In all modern European languages, the first word in a sentence is capitalized, as is the first word in any quoted sentence. (For example, in English: Nana said, "There are ripe watermelons in the garden!")
  - The first word of a sentence is not capitalized in most modern editions of ancient Greek and, to a lesser extent, Latin texts. The distinction between lower and upper case was not introduced before the Middle Ages; in antiquity only the capital forms of letters were used.
  - For some items, many style guides recommend that initial capitalization be avoided by not putting the item at the beginning of a sentence, or by writing it in lowercase even at the beginning of a sentence. Such scientific terms have their own rules about capitalization which take precedence over the standard initial capitalization rule. For example, pH would be liable to cause confusion if written PH, and initial m and M may even have different meanings, milli and mega, for example 2 MA (megamperes) is a billion times 2 mA (milliamperes). Increasingly nowadays, some trademarks and company names start with a lowercase letter, and similar considerations apply.
  - When the first letters of a word have been omitted and replaced by an apostrophe, the first letter in a sentence is usually left uncapitalized in English and certain other languages, as " 'tis a shame ..." In Dutch, the second word is capitalized instead in this situation: "'t Was leuk" vs. "Het was leuk" (both meaning "It was fun").
- Traditionally, the first words of a line of verse are capitalized in English, e.g.:
  Meanwhile, the winged Heralds, by command
  Of sovereign power, with awful ceremony
  And trumpet's sound, throughout the host proclaim
  A solemn council forthwith to be held
  At Pandemonium, the high capital
  Of Satan and his peers. [...] (Milton, Paradise Lost I:752–756)
  - Modernist poets often ignore or defy this convention.
- In the U.S., headlines and titles of works typically use title case, in which certain words (such as nouns, adjectives and verbs) are capitalized and others (such as prepositions and conjunctions) are not. In the U.K., titles of works use title case, but headlines generally use sentence case (or all caps in tabloid newspapers).

=== Special cases ===
==== Compound names ====
Compound names are nouns that are made up of more than one stem, or a stem and one or more affixes. (Note: Example: the Dutch name Verkerk, which is made up of the prefix Ver- and the noun kerk (church).) Names that are made up of several affixes and one or more nouns are not compound names under this definition, but noun phrases, that are made up of one or more separable affixes, and one or more nouns. Examples of the separable affixes may be found in List of family name affixes. (Note: Example: the Dutch name Van der Kerk is made up of the prefix van (which at the same time is a preposition); the article der (which is a declension of the definite article de); and the noun Kerk. The prefix Ver- is a contraction of the separable affixes, that has "bonded" with the noun. However, the surname Ver Huell is an example of a case where the prefix Ver has not yet become part of the name.) Noun phrases are in this context treated as if they were nouns. So the general rule that nouns-as-names are capitalized in principle applies to compound names and noun-phrases-as-names as well. There are, however, exceptions to this rule that differ by language community.

- In German, the separable affix, and at the same time preposition, von (meaning "of", pronounced [fɔn]) or genannt (meaning "named") in a surname (e.g. Alexander von Humboldt) is not capitalized (unless it is the first letter of a sentence). Von is however often dropped within a sentence. The same applies to similar Italian and Portuguese affixes. (Note: Examples: Alexander von Humboldt, von Humboldt. Humboldt (German); Giovanni da Verrazzano, da Verrazzano, Verrazzano (Italian); Vasco da Gama, da Gama, Gama (Portuguese))
- In Dutch, the first affix, like van; or de, or declensions of de; or contractions of a preposition and an article, like ter; in a surname are capitalized unless a given name, initial, or other family name. (Note: as in the married names of women) precedes it (Note: Examples: Cornelis de Witt, J. de Witt, Maria de Witt-van Berckel. But: the brothers De Witt. However, in Alexander Willem Maurits Carel Ver Huell Ver, though a separate affix, is not written with a lowercase letter, as Ver is not a preposition or a definite article as the exception requires.) Other affixes in the noun phrase (if present) are left lowercase. (Note: Examples: Van der Duyn van Maasdam; Van Nispen tot Pannerden.) However, in Belgium the capitalization of a surname follows the orthography as used for the person's name in the Belgian population register and on his or her identification card., except when introducing a title of nobility or when use of the lower case has been granted to some noble family. An exception for the rule that a Dutch name starts with an uppercase letter under all circumstances (including at the start of a sentence) is included in the general capitalization rule: "If the sentence begins with an apostrophe, the following full word is capitalized." (Note: Example: k Heb er niets meer van gehoord.) This also applies to Dutch names that begin with a contraction that consists of an apostrophe and a letter. (Note: Examples: names like 't Hoen and 'sGravesande.)
- In English, practice varies when the name starts with a particle (Note: An alternate technical term that overlaps with separable affix.) with a meaning such as "from" or "the" or "son of".
  - Some of these particles (Mac, Mc, M, O) are always capitalized; others (L', Van) are usually capitalized; still others often are not (d', de, di, von). The compound particle de La is usually written with the L capitalized but not the d. (Note: Actually, this follows the French usage for the so-called Nobiliary particle, Cf. also)
  - The remaining part of such a name, following the particle, is always capitalized if it is set off with a space as a separate word, or if the particle was not capitalized. It is normally capitalized if the particle is Mc, M, or O. In other cases (including Mac), there is no set rule (both Macintyre and MacIntyre are seen, for example).
- Americans with non-Anglophone surnames often have not followed the orthographic conventions usual in the language communities of their extraction (or the US immigration authorities flouted the orthographic rules for them when they arrived at ports of entry like Ellis Island). (Note: Examples: Martin Van Buren, not Martin van Buren; Ron DeSantis, not Ron De Santis; Leonardo DiCaprio, not Leonardo di Caprio; Karen Vanmeer not Karen Van Meer (fictional character played by Hedy Lamarr, who should have spelled her pseudonym "La Marr", like her model Barbara La Marr).) As there are no universally accepted capitalization rules in these circumstances to serve as a guideline the best policy would seem to be to use the style that dominates for that person in reliable sources; for a living subject, prefer the spelling consistently used in the subject's own publications.

==== Titles ====
The Chicago Manual of Style recommends that the titles of English-language artistic works (plays, novels, essays, paintings, etc.) capitalize the first word and the last word in the title. Additionally, most other words within a title are capitalized as well; articles and coordinating conjunctions are not capitalized. Sources disagree on the details of capitalizing prepositions. For example, the Chicago Manual of Style recommends rendering all prepositions in lowercase, whereas the APA style guide instructs: Capitalize major words in titles of books and articles within the body of the paper. Conjunctions, articles, and short prepositions are not considered major words; however, capitalize all words of four letters or more.

In other languages, such as the Romance languages, only the first word and proper names are capitalized.

==== Acronyms ====
Acronyms are usually capitalized, with a few exceptions:

- Acronyms which have become regular words such as laser and scuba.
- Some acronyms of proper nouns in which function words are not capitalized, such as TfL (Transport for London) and LotR (The Lord of the Rings).

==== "O" ====
- The English addressive particle O, an archaic form of address, e.g. Thou, O king, art a king of kings, is usually capitalised. However, lowercase o is also occasionally seen in this context.

==== Accents ====
In most languages that use diacritics, these are treated the same way in uppercase whether the text is capitalized or all-uppercase. They may be always preserved (as in German) or always omitted (as in Greek) or often omitted (as in French). Some attribute this to the fact that diacritics on capital letters were not available earlier on typewriters, and it is now becoming more common to preserve them in French and Spanish (in both languages the rule is to preserve them, although in France and Mexico, for instance, schoolchildren are often erroneously taught that they should not add diacritics on capital letters).

However, in the polytonic orthography used for Greek prior to 1982, accents were omitted in all-uppercase words, but kept as part of an uppercase initial (written before rather than above the letter). The latter situation is provided for by title-case characters in Unicode. When Greek is written with the present day monotonic orthography, where only the acute accent is used, the same rule is applied. The accent is omitted in all-uppercase words but it is kept as part of an uppercase initial (written before the letter rather than above it). The dialytika (diaeresis) should also always be used in all-uppercase words (even in cases where they are not needed when writing in lowercase, e.g. ΑΫΛΟΣ — άυλος).

==== Digraphs and ligatures ====
Some languages treat certain digraphs as single letters for the purpose of collation. In general, where one such is formed as a ligature, the corresponding uppercase form is used in capitalization; where it is written as two separate characters, only the first will be capitalized. Thus Oedipus or Œdipus are both correct, but OEdipus is not. Examples with ligature include Ærøskøbing in Danish, where Æ/æ is a completely separate letter rather than merely a typographic ligature (the same applies in Icelandic); examples with separate characters are Llanelli in Welsh, where Ll is a single letter; and Ffrangeg in Welsh where Ff is equivalent to English F (whereas Welsh F corresponds to English V). Presentation forms, however, can use doubled capitals, such as the logo of the National Library of Wales (Llyfrgell Genedlaethol Cymru). The position in Hungarian is similar to the latter.

- An exception is the Dutch digraph IJ. Both letters are capitalized even though they are printed separately when using a computer, as in IJsselmeer. In the past the digraph was written as Y, and this still survives in some surnames.
- A converse exception exists in the Croatian alphabet, where digraph letters (Dž, Lj, Nj) have mixed-case forms even when written as ligatures. With typewriters and computers, these "title-case" forms have become less common than 2-character equivalents; nevertheless they can be represented as single title-case characters in Unicode (ǅ, ǈ, ǋ).
- In Czech the digraph ch (usually considered as a single letter) can be capitalized in two ways: Ch or CH. In general only the first part is capitalized (Ch), unless the whole text is written in capital letters (then it is written CH). In acronyms both parts are usually capitalized, such as VŠCHT for Vysoká škola chemicko-technologická (University of Chemistry and Technology). However, the practice is not unified when writing initial letters of personal names (first name and surname), for example Jan Chudoba can be abbreviated both J. Ch. or J. CH.

==== Initial mutation ====
In languages where inflected forms of a word may have extra letters at the start, the capitalized letter may be the initial of the root form rather than the inflected form. For example, in Irish, in the placename Sliabh na mBan, "(the) mountain of the women" (anglicized as Slievenamon), the word-form written mBan contains the genitive plural of the noun bean, "woman", mutated after the genitive plural definite article (i.e., "of the"). The written B is mute in this form.

Other languages may capitalize the initial letter of the orthographic word, even if it is not present in the base, as with definite nouns in Maltese that start with certain consonant clusters. For example, l-Istati Uniti (the United States) capitalize the epenthetic I, even though the base form of the word — without the definite article — is stati.

==== Case-sensitive English words ====
In English, there are a few capitonyms, which are words whose meaning (and sometimes pronunciation) varies with capitalization. For example, the month August versus the adjective august, the month May and the auxiliary verb may, or the verb polish versus the adjective Polish.

== Capitalization styles ==
The following names are given to systems of capitalization:

=== Sentence case ===
"The quick brown fox jumps over the lazy dog."
The standard case used in English prose. Generally equivalent to the baseline universal standard of formal English orthography mentioned above; that is, only the first word is capitalized, except for proper nouns and other words which are generally capitalized by a more specific rule.

A variation is mid-sentence case which is identical to sentence case except that the first word is not capitalized (unless it would be capitalized by another rule). This type of letter case is used for entries in dictionaries.

=== Title case ===
"The Quick Brown Fox Jumps Over the Lazy Dog."
Also known as headline case and capital case. All words capitalized, except for certain subsets defined by rules that are not universally standardized, often minor words such as "the" (as above), "of", or "and". Other commonly lowercase words are prepositions and coordinating conjunctions. The standardization is only at the level of house styles and individual style manuals. (See Headings and publication titles.) A simplified variant is start case, where all words, including articles, prepositions, and conjunctions, start with a capital letter.

=== All caps ===
"THE QUICK BROWN FOX JUMPS OVER THE LAZY DOG."
Also written as all-caps. Capital letters only. This style can be used for headlines and book or chapter titles at the top of a book page. It is commonly used in transcribed speech to indicate that a person is shouting, or to indicate a hectoring and obnoxious speaker. For this reason, it is generally discouraged. Long spans of Latin-alphabet text in all uppercase are harder to read because of the absence of the ascenders and descenders found in lowercase letters, which can aid recognition. In professional documents, a commonly preferred alternative to all caps text is the use of small caps to emphasize key names or acronyms, or the use of italics or (more rarely) bold. In addition, if all caps must be used, it is customary in headings of a few words to slightly widen the spacing between the letters, by around 10% of the point height. This practice is known as tracking or letterspacing.

== See also ==
- Camel case
- Capitalization of Internet
- Capitalization in English
- Letter case
- Orthography
- Reverential capitalization
- Capitalization conspiracy
