= Data card =

A datacard is an electronic card for data operations (storage, transfer, transformation, input, output).

== Datacard types ==
Datacards can be sorted by their purposes:

1. Expansion card – printed-circuit board: inserted in a special slot in the device and used to add functions to this device;
2. Memory card or flash card: a card which is inserted into the corresponding device socket and used for data storage and transmission;
3. Identification card: a card that works by a contact/contactless interface and contains the data used for performance of various functions, for example access control in subway or offices. It is also used for prepaid services like banking and telecom;
4. Datacard or "electronic card": a card dealing with e.g. geographical, climatic, road or topographical data to be displayed on the video screen of some device (computer or GPS navigator), or represented otherwise to be more convenient to use in a certain situation (for example, navigator's vocal instructions).

== Expansion cards ==
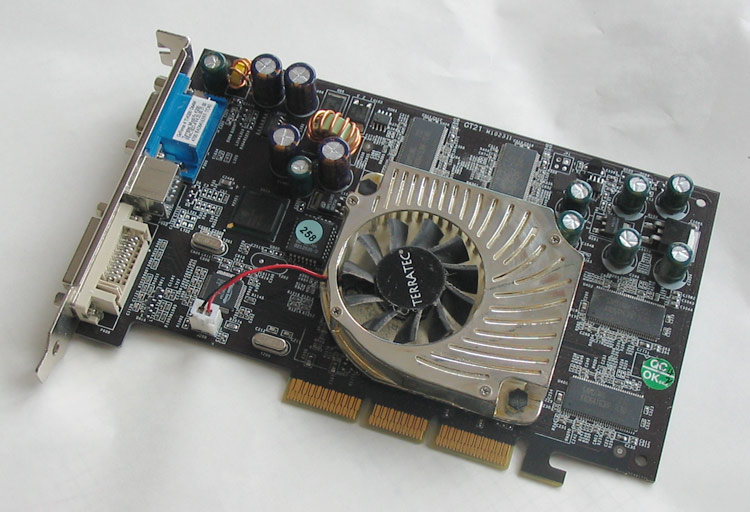
Videocard

The expansion card in the computer is equipped with contacts on one of its edges, and it can be inserted into the motherboard slot socket.

There are various types of expansion cards:

- A videocard transforms data from the computer memory into the video signal for the monitor. The videocard has its own processor, relieving the CPU of the computer;
- A sound card enables the computer to work with sound;
- A network card enables the computer to interact on a local network.

== Memory cards ==
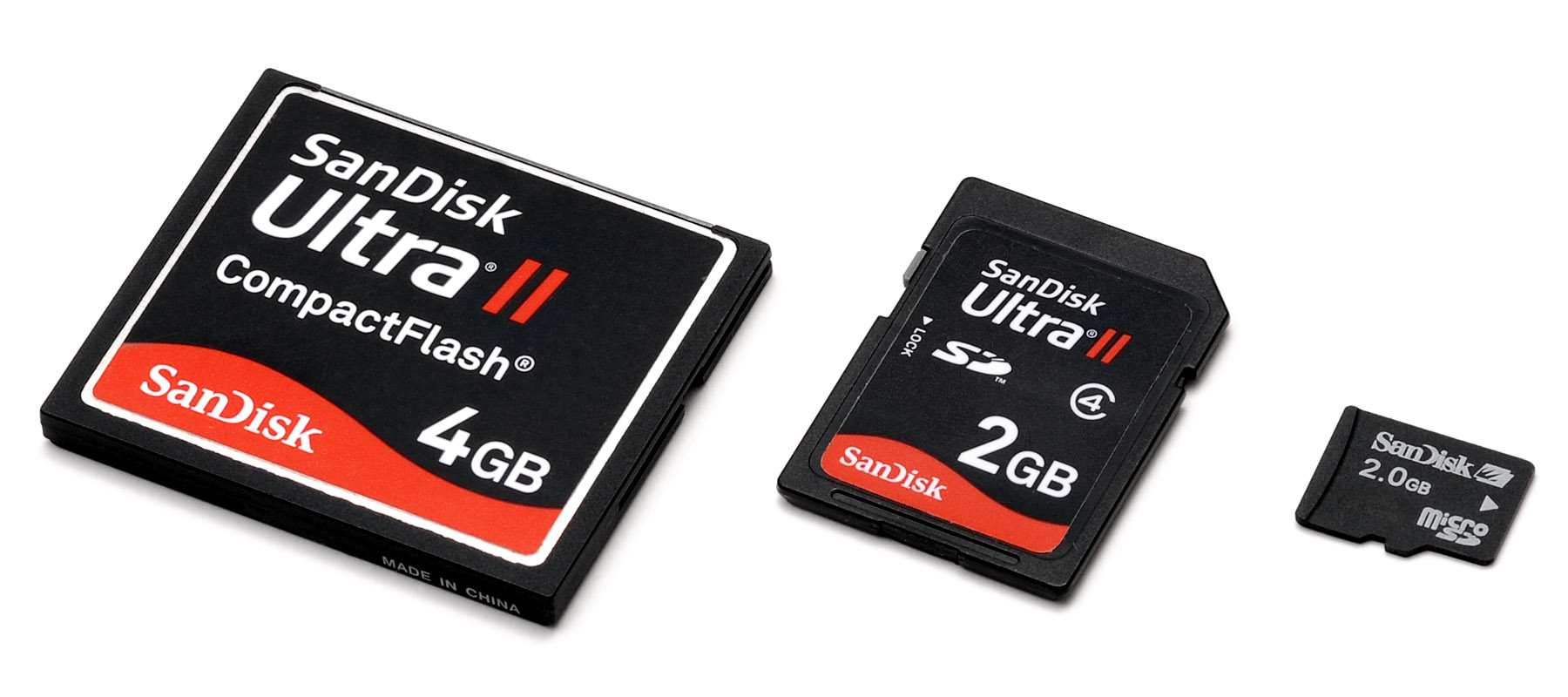
Flash cards

Many modern devices demand non-volatile memory requiring low power. Flash memory is used for these purposes. It is widespread in digital portable devices such as photo and video cameras, dictaphones, MP3 players, handheld computers, mobile phones, and also in smart phones and communicators. It is used for storage of the built-in software in various devices (like routers, mini-phonestations, printers, scanners, modems and controllers).

In recent years USB flash-drives have become more popular and have almost replaced diskettes and CDs. Flash memory is well known from its use in USB flash-drives.

Flash cards also are based on flash memory, such as Secure Digital (SD), Compact Flash and Memory Stick. These are much used in portable devices (cameras, mobile phones). Flash memory constitutes the biggest part of the portable data device market.

== Identification cards ==
=== Contact cards with ISO/IEC 7816 interface ===
Contact smart cards (with chip) have a contact zone consisting of a few small contact petals. When the card is inserted into the reader, the chip connects with the card reader which can then read and write information. The standard ISO/IEC 7816 also regulates data exchange protocols and some aspects of work with other smart card data.

Such cards are used for holder authorization for reception of certain services, such as bank account access for payments realization, use of prepaid mobile services, etc.

The most widespread contact smart cards are SIM cards, payphone cards and some banking cards.

=== Contact cards with USB interface ===
This is often a microcircuit, such as a SIM card segregated from the ISO/IEC 7816 card and mounted in a tiny case with reader and USB connector. It makes smart-card application for computer authentification much more convenient.

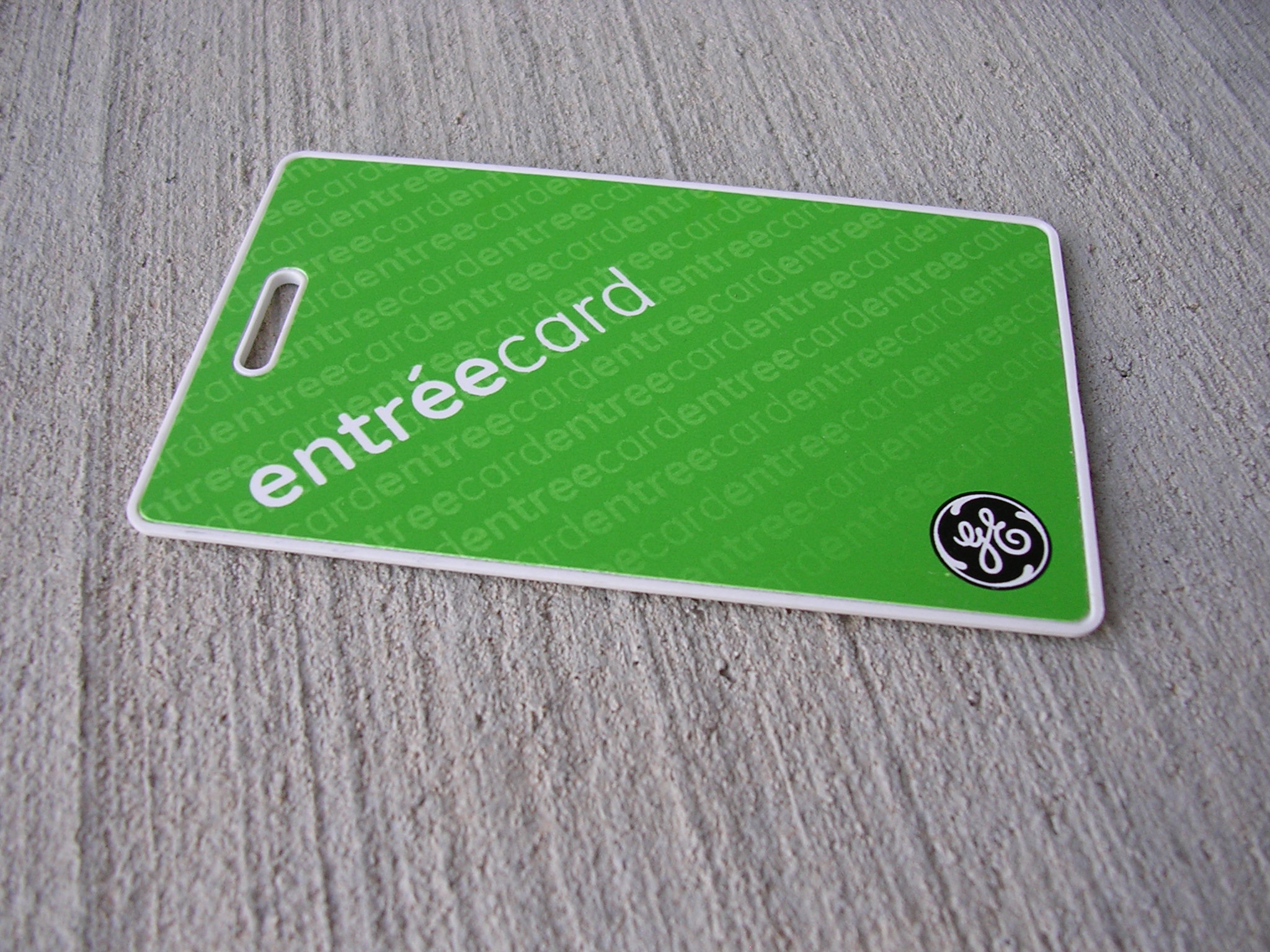
Contactless pass card

For example, an electronic key or eToken which is a personal authentification tool and a protected data storage device, supporting work with digital certificates and with an electronic digital signature.

=== Contactless cards ===
These are smart cards that communicate with the reader through radio transmission. The card must be close enough to the reader to perform necessary operations. Contactless cards are often used in areas where operations must be performed quickly, for example in public transport.

There are many examples of contactless smart cards, such as travel tickets in underground and ground transport, the electronic ("biometric") passports, as well as some kinds of cards in access monitoring systems.
