= Homology (sociology) =

Homologies are "structural 'resonances'...between the different elements making up a socio-cultural whole." (Middleton 1990, p. 9)

Examples include Alan Lomax's cantometrics, which:

Distinguishes ten musical styles, dealing most fully with Eurasian and Old European styles. These are correlated with sexual permissiveness, status of women, and treatment of children as the principal formative social influences. The musical styles are at the same time symbolic or expressive of such social influences, especially in the various musical communities of Spain and Italy, and are stable, persistent. Lomax states his expectation that further study and refinement of methods of measurement will increase our understanding of the relationships of musical style and culture in a way that Western European musical notation cannot adequately accomplish.

Richard Middleton (1990, p. 9-10) argues that "such theories always end up in some kind of reductionism – 'upwards', into an idealist cultural spirit, 'downwards', into economism, sociologism or technologism, or by 'circumnavigation', in a functionalist holism." However, he "would like to hang on to the notion of homology in a qualified sense. For it seems likely that some signifying structures are more easily articulated to the interests of one group than are some others; similarly, that they are more easily articulated to the interests of one group than to those of another. This is because, owing to the existence of what Paul Willis calls the 'objective possibilities' (and limitations) of material and ideological structures, it is easier to find links and analogies between them in some cases than in others (Willis 1978: 198-201)."

== Sources ==
- Middleton, Richard (1990/2002). Studying Popular Music. Philadelphia: Open University Press. ISBN 0-335-15275-9.
- Lomax, Alan (1959). "Folk Song Style." American Anthropologist 61 (Dec. 1959): 927–54.
- Lomax, Alan (1968). Folk Song Style and Culture. New Brunswick, U.S.A.: Transaction Publishers, 2000. ISBN 0-87855-640-0
- Willis, Paul (1978). Profane Culture. London: Routledge & Kegan Paul. ISBN 0-7100-8789-6
