= Harald Prins =

Dutch anthropologist and filmmaker

Harald E. L. Prins
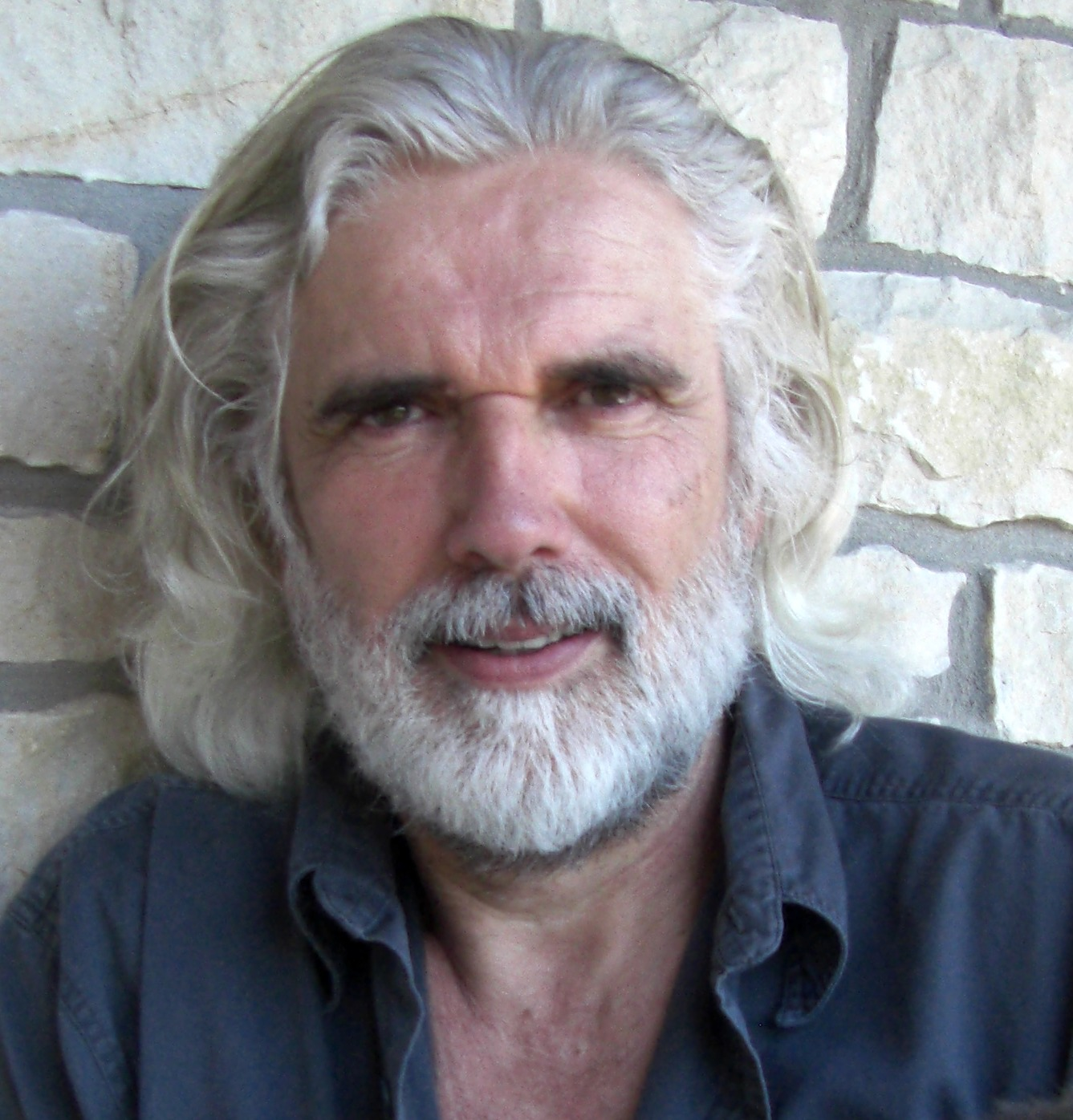
- Harald Prins in 2007
- Born: September 7, 1951 (age 74); Alphen aan den Rijn, Netherlands
- Education: Radboud University, Netherlands; New School for Social Research, New York
- Known for: Native American tribal status recognition, hunting and fishing rights, land claims; visual anthropology; cultural anthropology textbook
- Awards: Kansas Professor of the year '06, Carnegie Foundation for the Advancement of Teaching; Presidential Award for Outstanding Undergraduate Teaching '99; John Culkin Award for Outstanding Praxis in the Field of Media Ecology '04, Oxford University Press Award for Excellence in Undergraduate Teaching of Anthropology, American Anthropological Association '10.
- Scientific career
- Fields: Cultural Anthropology, Ethnohistory, Visual Anthropology
- Workplaces: Kansas State University
- Doctoral advisors: Eric R. Wolf, Michael J. Harner, Anton Blok

Harald E. L. Prins (born 1951) is a Dutch anthropologist, ethnohistorian, filmmaker, and human rights activist specialized in North and South America's indigenous peoples and cultures.

== Biography ==
Harald Prins was born in the Netherlands and is a University Distinguished Professor of anthropology at Kansas State University.

Academically trained at various universities in the Netherlands, where he studied prehistoric archaeology, history, and cultural anthropology, among others under Anton Weiler, Albert Trouwborst, Anton Blok, and Ton Lemaire, he completed his doctoraal at the Radboud University Nijmegen (1976). After two years as an assistant professor in theoretical history at its graduate program, he came to New York City under the auspices of the Netherlands-America Institute in 1978. As a Vera List Fellow at the Graduate Faculty of Social and Political Science, the New School for Social Research (1978–1979), he studied anthropology under Eric Wolf, Michael Harner, Edmund Snow Carpenter and others. In addition, he received formal training in advanced 16mm film-making in NYC (1979–1980).

Although he has also done research among half a dozen other indigenous nations in North and South America, he is primarily known for his ethnographic and historic research on Wabanaki Indian peoples and cultures, in particular the Mi'kmaq (or Micmac). After ethnographic fieldwork in La Pampa Province, Argentina (1980–1981), he merged the theoretical perspectives of cultural ecology and political economy into a concept of political ecology. During a decade of applied anthropology among Maine Indians as Director of Research and Development for the Association of Aroostook Indians (1981–1982), and as tribal anthropologist for the Aroostook Band of Micmacs (1982–1990), he was instrumental in helping this impoverished and landless indigenous community win federal recognition of its tribal status and a 5,000-acre (20 km^{2}) land base in northern Maine.. He also served as Expert Witness on native rights in the United States Senate (1989) and in several Canadian courts (1996, 2000), and was an international observer in the presidential elections of Paraguay (1993). Since 2013, he has served as lead expert witness on riverine sovereignty and tribal reservation boundaries for the Penobscot Indian Nation in a U.S. federal court case.

Author of numerous publications in eight languages, including books and edited volumes, he is also international award-winning documentary filmmaker. He was visual anthropology editor for American Anthropologist (1998–2002), and served as president of the Society of Visual Anthropology (1999–2001).

Having previously taught at Radboud University Nijmegen, Bowdoin College, Colby College, and the University of Maine, he has won numerous outstanding teaching awards at Kansas State U., including the 1993 Conoco Award, the 1999 Presidential Award, and the 2004 Coffman Chair of Distinguished Teaching Scholars. In 2005, he was appointed University Distinguished Professor, the highest academic rank. A year later, the Carnegie Foundation for the Advancement of Teaching selected him as Kansas Professor of the Year. Most recently, he taught as Guest Professor of Social Anthropology at Lund University in Sweden (2010). The American Anthropological Association honored him with the 2010 AAA/Oxford University Press Award for Excellence in Undergraduate Teaching. He served as guest curator and was subsequently a research associate at the National Museum of Natural History, Smithsonian Institution in Washington DC (2003-2011).

Son of Dutch maritime anthropologist A. H. J. Prins and godson of Kikuyu and Swahili specialist Harold E. Lambert, Senior District Commissioner in British colonial Kenya, he is married to American author and journalist Bunny McBride.

== Publications ==
- "Two George Washington Medals: Missing Links in the Chain of Friendship between the U.S. and the Wabanaki Confederacy." Pp. 9–11. The Medal (British Museum, 1985)
- "A Wabanaki Renaissance?: Political Movement among Micmacs and Maliseets." (in Dutch) Pp. 108–44. Terugkeer van een Verdwijnend Volk. (eds. T. Lemaire and F. Wojciechowski, 1985)
- "Micmacs and Maliseets in the St. Lawrence River Valley." Pp. 263–78. Papers of the Seventeenth Algonquian Conference. (ed. W. Cowan, 1986)
- "Norridgewock: Village Translocation on the New England-Acadian Frontier." Pp. 137–58. Man in the Northeast, No.33 (with B. Bourque, 1987).
- Tribulations of a Border Tribe: Discourse on the Political Ecology of the Aroostook Band of Micmacs (16th-20th Centuries). (1988)
- "American Indians and the Ethnocinematic Complex: From Native Participation to Production Control." Pp. 80–90. Eyes Across the Water. (R. Boonzajer Flaes, 1989)
- "The Anthropologist as 'Trickster': Critical Reflection and Political Action in Anthropology." (in Dutch). Pp. 174–87. Natuur en Cultuur. (eds., R. Corbey & P. v.d. Grijp, 1990)
- "Cornfields at Meductic: Ethnic and Territorial Configurations in Colonial Acadia. Pp.55-72. Man in the Northeast, No.44 (1992).
- "To the Land of the Mistigoches: American Indians Traveling to Europe in the Age of Exploration." Pp. 175–95. Am. Indian and Culture and Research Journal, Vol.17 (1993).
- American Beginnings: Exploration, Culture, and Cartography in the Land of Norumbega. (co-ed. with E. Baker et al., 1994)
- "Children of Gluskap: Wabanaki Indians on the Eve of the European Invasion." Pp. 165–211. American Beginnings. (eds. W. Baker et al., 1994)
- "Neo-Traditions in Native Communities: Sweatlodge and Sundance among the Micmac Today." Pp. 383–94. Proceedings of the 25th Algonquian Conference. (ed. W. Cowan, 1994)
- "Turmoil on the Wabanaki Frontier, 1524–1678." Pp. 97–119. Maine: The Pine Tree State from Prehistory to Present. (ed. R. Judd, 1995)
- "Tribal Network and Migrant Labor: Mi'kmaq Indians as Seasonal Workers in Aroostook's Potato Fields (1870–1980)." Pp. 45–65. Native Americans and Wage Labor. (eds. A. Littlefield and M. Knack, 1996)
- The Mi'kmaq: Resistance, Accommodation and Cultural Survival. (Harcourt Brace, 1996)
- "Chief Rawandagon alias Robin Hood: Native 'Lord of Misrule' in the Maine Wilderness." Pp. 93–115. Northeastern Indian Lives, 1632–1816. (ed. R. Grumet, 1996)
- "Walking the Medicine Line: Molly Ockett, A Pigwacket Doctor." (with B. McBride) Pp. 321–47.Northeastern Indian Lives, 1632–1816. (ed. R. Grumet, 1996)
- "The Paradox of Primitivism: Native Rights and the Problem of Imagery in Cultural Survival Films." Pp. 243–66. Visual Anthropology Vol.9 (1997).
- "Chief Big Thunder (1827–1906): The Life of a Penobscot Trickster." Pp. 140–58. Maine History Vol.37 (1998).
- "Storm Clouds over Wabanakiak: Confederacy Diplomacy until Dummer’s Treaty (1727)" https://web.archive.org/web/20161106174427/http://www.wabanaki.com/Harald_Prins.htm
- "A Handful of Ashes: Reflections on Tristes Tropiques." Pp. 94–99. Contemporary Cultures and Societies of Latin America. (ed. Dwight R. Heath, 2001)
- "The Crooked Path of Dummer's Treaty: Anglo-Wabanaki Diplomacy and the Quest for Aboriginal Rights." Pp. 360–77. Papers of the 33rd Algonquian Conference (ed. H.C. Wolfart, 2002)
- The Origins of Visual Anthropology. Visual Anthropology Review (co-ed. with Jay Ruby, 2002)
- "Visual Media and the Primitivist Perplex." Pp. 58–74. Media Worlds: Anthropology on New Terrain. (ed. by F. Ginsburg et al., 2002)
- "Visual Anthropology." Pp. 505–25. A Companion to the Anthropology of American Indians. (ed. by T. Biolsi, 2004) https://chairoflogicphiloscult.files.wordpress.com/2013/02/a-companion-to-anthropology-of-american-indians.pdf
- "Pragmatic Idealism in Challenging Structural Power: Reflections on Advocacy Anthropology." Pp. 183–200. Ethik, Ethos, Ethnos: Aspekte und Probleme Interkultureller Kritik. (ed., A. Hornbacher, 2006)
- The Essence of Anthropology. (multiple editions, most recent 4th ed, with W. Haviland et al., 2015)
- Evolution and Prehistory: The Human Challenge. (multiple editions, 10th ed., with W. Haviland et al., 2013)
- Cultural Anthropology: The Human Challenge. (multiple editions, most recent 15th ed., with W. Haviland et al., 2017)
- Anthropology: The Human Challenge. (multiple editions, most recent 15th ed., with W. Haviland et al., 2017)
- "Vers un monde sans mal: Alfred Métraux, un anthropologue à l'UNESCO." Pp. 115–25. 60 Ans d'Histoire de l'Unesco. Paris: UNESCO, 2005 (with E. Krebs)
- "Edmund Carpenter: A Trickster's Exploration in Culture & Media." (with J. Bishop). Pp. 207–46. Memories of the Origins of Ethnographic Film. (ed. by B. Engelbrecht, 2007)
- Asticou's Island Domain: Wabanaki Peoples at Mount Desert Island 1500–2000. Boston: Northeast Region Ethnography Program. National Park Service, U.S. Dept of the Interior 2007. (2 vols, with B. McBride). Digitally published on National Park Service website:
- Indians in Eden: Wabanakis and Rusticators on Maine's Mt. Desert Island, 1840s–1920s. (with B. McBride) Camden: Down East Books, 2009
- "The Atlatl as Combat Weapon in 17th-Century Amazonia: Tapuya Indian Warriors in Dutch Colonial Brazil." In The Atlatl 23(2):1-3. http://waa.basketmakeratlatl.com/wp-content/uploads/2013/02/Tapuya-Atlatl-Article-by-Harald-Prins-25-May-2010.pdf
- Princípios de Antropologia. São Paulo, Brazil: Cengage Learning Learning Edições, Ltda, 2011 (co-authored with Haviland et al.)
- "Ethnographic Portraits, 1967-71." pp. 212–219, 366-367. Irving Penn: Centennial. Maria. M. Hambourg, ed., New York: Metropolitan Museum of Art/Yale U Press. 2017
- "From Indian Island to Omaha Beach: The D-Day Story of Charles Shay, Penobscot War Hero." (1st author, with B. McBride). Bath, Me.: Wisbee Creek Press, 2019. ISBN 978-0578497273 See https://www.amazon.com/Indian-Island-Omaha-Beach-Penobscot/dp/0578497271#reader_0578497271
- "From Indian Island to Omaha Beach: The Story of Charles Shay, Penobscot Indian War Hero." (with B. McBride). Lincoln: U Nebraska Press, 2020 (expected).

== Documentary films ==
- Our Lives in Our Hands (with Karen Carter, 1986) (about Mi'kmaq Indian basketmakers in Maine)
- Wabanaki: A New Dawn (by David Westphall and Dennis Kostyk, 1995) (served as major research consultant)
- Oh, What a Blow that Phantom Gave Me! (with John Melville Bishop, 2003) (about Edmund Snow Carpenter)
- Among Xavante Friends (with Adam Bohannon and Jessie Stone, 2008) (about Harvard anthropologist David Maybury-Lewis, founder of Cultural Survival)
