= Edmund Snow Carpenter =

American anthropologist

- Born: September 2, 1922; Rochester, New York, U.S.
- Died: July 1, 2011 (aged 88); Southampton, New York, U.S.
- Education: University of Pennsylvania (BS, PhD)
- Years active: 1941–2011
- Known for: Anthropologist best known for his work on tribal art and visual media
- Spouse(s): Florence Ofelia Camara (1946-mid-1950s); Virginia York Wilson (1960s); Adelaide de Menil (late 1960s to his death in 2011)
- Children: 3
- Parent(s): Fletcher Hawthorne Carpenter; Agnes Barbara Wight
- Relatives: John C. Carpenter (brother); Barbara Carpenter (sister); Collins W. Carpenter (brother)

Edmund Snow Carpenter (September 2, 1922 – July 1, 2011) was an American anthropologist best known for his work on tribal art and visual media.

== Early life ==
Edmund Snow Carpenter was born on September 2, 1922, in Rochester, New York to the artist and educator Fletcher Hawthorne Carpenter (1879–1954) and Agnes "Barbara" Wight (1883–1981). He was one of four children.

He was a fraternal twin with Collins W. "Connie" Carpenter, later of Canandaigua, New York.

He was a descendant of William Carpenter (1605 England - 1658/1659 Rehoboth, Massachusetts) the founder of the Rehoboth Carpenter family who came to America in the mid-1630s.

Carpenter began his anthropology studies under Frank G. Speck at the University of Pennsylvania in 1940. After completing his semester in early 1942, he volunteered to serve his country during World War II.

== World War II ==
He joined the United States Marine Corps in early 1942, fighting in the Pacific Theater of Operations for the duration of the war especially in New Guinea, the Solomon Islands, the Marianas, and Iwo Jima. After the war ended, he was assigned to oversee hundreds of Japanese prisoners, putting them to work on an archaeological dig in Tumon, Guam.

== Post war ==
Discharged as a captain in 1946, he returned to the University of Pennsylvania using his G.I. Bill, was awarded a bachelor's degree, and earned his doctorate four years later in 1950. His doctoral dissertation was on the pre-history of the Northeast, entitled Intermediate Period Influences in the Northeast.

Carpenter began teaching anthropology at the University of Toronto in 1948, taking side jobs such as radio programming for the Canadian Broadcasting Corporation (CBC). In 1950, he started fieldwork among the Aivilingmiut, returning to these Inuit in Nunavut in the famine winter of 1951–52, and again in 1955.

When public television took off in Canada with the launching of CBC-TV in 1952, Carpenter began producing and hosting a series of shows.

Moving back and forth between Toronto's broadcasting studios and Arctic hunting camps, Carpenter collaborated on the theoretical ideas in development by Harold Innis and Marshall McLuhan. He and McLuhan co-taught a course, and together hatched core ideas about the agency of modern media in the process of culture change.

In 1953, after a well-received proposal written by Carpenter, he and McLuhan received a Ford Foundation grant for an interdisciplinary media research project, which funded both the Seminar on Culture and Communication (1953–1959) and their co-edited periodical Explorations throughout the 1950s. Meanwhile, Carpenter continued his programs on CBC-TV, including a weekly show also titled "Explorations" (which started as a radio program).

Together with Harold Innis, Eric A. Havelock, and Northrop Frye, McLuhan and Carpenter have been characterized as the Toronto School of communication theory. In his famous article "The New Languages" (1956), Carpenter offers a succinct analysis of modern media based on years of participant observation in different cultures, academic and popular print publishing, and radio and television broadcasting.

== Visual media ==
In 1959, Carpenter joined anthropologist Raoul Naroll at San Fernando Valley State College (California State University-Northridge) and was appointed an assistant professor and founder of an experimental interdisciplinary program of Anthropology and Art, where students were trained in visual media, including filming. As the only faculty member in the new department, Carpenter went on to hire more faculty. In 1960, he was promoted to the rank of associate professor. In 1961, he was made chairman of the anthropology department.

With award-winning filmmaker Robert Cannon, he made an innovative documentary about "surrealist" Kuskokwim Eskimo masks. Carpenter also co-authored Georgia Sea Island Singers (1964), a film documenting six traditional African-American songs and dances by Gullahs of St. Simon Island, based on fieldwork by Alan Lomax. And with Bess Lomax Hawes, he collaborated on Buck Dancer (1965), a short film featuring Ed Young, an African-American musician-dancer from Mississippi. In 1967, however, just when visual anthropology began to take institutional form as an academic enterprise, the program was closed.

During this period, Carpenter worked with McLuhan on the latter's book Understanding Media (1964). In 1967 McLuhan was awarded the Schweitzer Chair at Fordham University, and he brought Carpenter (on a sabbatical from Northridge), Harley Parker, and Eric McLuhan to be on his research team.

On leave from his faculty position at Northridge, Carpenter subsequently held the Carnegie Chair in anthropology at the University of California, Santa Cruz (1968–69), and then took a research professorship at the University of Papua New Guinea, officially having resigned his position at Northridge. Joined by photographer Adelaide de Menil (who later became his wife), he journeyed to remote mountain areas where indigenous Papua had "no acquaintance" yet with writing, radios, or cameras. They took numerous Polaroid and 35mm photographs, made sound recordings, and shot some 400,000 feet of 16mm film in black and white, as well as color and infrared film.

During the next dozen years, Carpenter taught at various universities, including Adelphi University (c. 1970–1980), Harvard, New School University, and New York University (c. 1980–1981). In addition to numerous other publications, he also completed art historian Carl Schuster's massive cross-cultural study on traditional art motifs, Materials for the Study of Social Symbolism in Ancient and Tribal Art: A Record of Tradition and Continuity, published privately in three volumes, with a much-abbreviated one-volume version published in 1996 by Abrams under the title Patterns That Connect.

In 2008, Carpenter guest-curated an important Eskimo traditional and prehistoric art exhibit Upside Down: Les Arctiques at the Musée du quai Branly, the ethnographic art museum in Paris, France. This exhibit was re-installed in 2011 as Upside Down: Arctic Realities at The Menil Collection, an art museum in Houston, Texas, which, since 1999, also houses his permanent exhibit Witnesses to a Surrealist Vision.

== Personal life and death ==
On June 14, 1946, Carpenter married a fellow student at the University of Pennsylvania, Florence Ofelia Camara, and had two children with her; sons Stephen and Rhys. Their marriage united two of the earliest English and Spanish families to settle in the New World: the Camaras were a Spanish Conquistador family who settled in the Yucatán Peninsula of Mexico. They served under Francisco de Montejo, the Adelantado and Capitan General of Yucatán, and after that under his son, Francisco de Montejo (el Mozo), conqueror of the Yucatán. They divorced in the mid-1950s.

On September 6, 1961, in Yorkville, Michigan, Carpenter married Virginia York Wilson, of Toronto, the daughter of the well-known Canadian artist Ronald York Wilson. This marriage produced a third son, Ian Snow Carpenter. This marriage also ended in divorce.

In the late 1960s, Carpenter met Adelaide de Menil, the daughter of Dominique de Menil and John de Menil of Houston, Texas. Adelaide was a professional photographer who had worked for the American Museum of Natural History, and who joined Carpenter in New Guinea when he took a professorship there in 1969. Their collaborations and subsequent marriage lasted until his death in 2011.

Carpenter died on July 1, 2011. He was 88 years old.

== Memorial service ==
A memorial service for Carpenter, attended by 400 people, was held on October 29, 2011, at the LeFrak Theater of the American Museum of Natural History in New York City. It was followed by a celebration of his life at the Metropolitan Pavilion, 125 West 18th Street.

== Selected publications ==
- "An Unusual Pottery Jar from East Milton" (1943) Bulletin Of The Massachusetts Archaeological Society, Vol.4, No.3, April, 1943. (submitted December, 1942)
- Intermediate Period Influences in the Northeast. (PhD Thesis, U Penn, 1950)
- Eskimo. (with Robert Flaherty, 1959)
- Explorations in Communication, An Anthology. (co-edited with Marshall McLuhan, 1960)
- They Became What They Beheld. (1970)
- Oh, What a Blow That Phantom Gave Me! (1972)
- Eskimo Realities (1973)
- "The Tribal Terror of Self-Awareness." Pp. 451–461. In: Paul Hockings, ed., Principles of Visual Anthropology. (1975a)
- "Collecting Northwest Coast Art." pp. 8–27. In: Bill Holm & William Reid. Form and Freedom: A Dialogue on Northwest Coast Indian Art. (1975b)
- In the Middle, Qitinganituk: The Eskimo Today. (with Stephen G. Williams, 1983)
- Social Symbolism in Ancient and Tribal Art. (with Carl Schuster; 3 Parts, 12 vols., 1986–1988)
- Patterns That Connect:Social Symbolism in Ancient & Tribal Art. (1996)
- "19th Century Aivilik/Iglulik Drawings." pp. 71–92. In Fifty Years of Arctic Research: Anthropological Studies. Eds. R. Gillberg and H.C. Gullov. Copenhagen: The National Museum of Denmark. (1997)
- "Arctic Witnesses." pp. 303–310. In Fifty Years of Arctic Research: Anthropological Studies. Eds. R. Gillberg and H.C. Gullov. Copenhagen: The National Museum of Denmark. (1997)
- "That Not-So-Silent Sea." pp. 236–261. In: Donald Theall. The Virtual Marshall McLuhan. (2001)
- "European Motifs in Protohistoric Iroquois Art." pp. 255–262. In: W.H. Merrill and I. Goddard, eds., Anthropology, History, and American Indians: Essays in Honor of William Curtis Sturtevant. (2002)
- Norse Penny. (2003a)
- Comock: The True Story of an Eskimo Hunter. (with Robert Flaherty, 2003b)
- Two Essays: Chief & Greed. (2005)
- "Marshall." pp. 179–184. Explorations in Media Ecology, Vol.5, No.3 (2006)
- Upside Down: Arctic Realities. Ed. Edmund Carpenter. Houston: Menil Foundation/Yale U Press. (2011)

== Documentary film ==
- Oh, What a Blow that Phantom Gave Me! (2003; Video/DVD, 55 minutes). Filmmakers John Melville Bishop and Harald E.L. Prins,
