= Cantometrics =

Social science and musical methodology

Cantometrics ("song measurements") is a method developed by Alan Lomax and a team of researchers for relating elements of the world's traditional vocal music (or folk songs) to features of social organization as defined via George Murdock's Human Relations Area Files, resulting in a taxonomy of expressive human communication style. Lomax defined Cantometrics as the study of singing as normative expressive behavior and maintained that Cantometrics reveals folk performance style to be a "systems-maintaining framework" which models key patterns of co-action in everyday life. His work on Cantometrics gave rise to further comparative studies of aspects of human communication in relation to culture, including: Choreometrics, Parlametrics, Phonotactics (an analysis of vowel frequency in speech), and Minutage (a study of breath management).

Instead of the traditional Western musicological descriptive criteria of pitch, rhythm, and harmony, Cantometrics employs 37 style factors developed by Lomax and his team in consultation with specialists in linguistics, otolaryngology and voice therapy. The vocal style factors were designed to be easily rated by observers on a five-point scale according to their presence or absence. They include, for example: group cohesion in singing; orchestral organization; tense or relaxed vocal quality; breathiness; short or long phrases; rasp (vocal grating, such as associated, for example with the singing of Louis Armstrong); presence and percentage of vocables versus meaningful words); and melisma (ornamentation), to name a few.

In the early stages of his work on the Cantometrics coding system, Lomax wrote of the relationship of musical style to culture:

"Its fundamental diagnostic traits appear to be vocal quality (color, timbre, normal pitch, attack, type of melodic ornamentation, etc.) and the degree in which song is normally monodic or polyphonic. The determinative socio-psychological factors seem to be . . . the type of social organization, the pattern of erotic life, and the treatment of children.... I myself believe that the voice quality is the root [diagnostic] element. From this socio-psychological complex there seem to arise a complex of habitual musical practices which we call musical style"

== History of the method ==
Lomax first publicly proposed the Cantometrics project in 1959 and launched a group project in conjunction with the Anthropology Department at Columbia University to implement his vision. Early collaborators included musicologist Victor Grauer, who was the first co-creator with Lomax of the Cantometrics computer coding system. Subsequent project members included distinguished Columbia anthropologist Conrad M. Arensberg, a founder of applied anthropology; anthropologists Edwin Erickson and Barbara Ayres; and statistician Norman Berkowitz. Laban shape notation specialist Irmgard Bartenieff and dancer and movement therapist Forrestine Paulay co-created the Choreometrics movement coding system, for analyzing dance, mapping the movement of the torso, hands, feet, and use of performance space. In 1968 Lomax's research team published a book, Folk Song Style and Culture, in which they stated that, "for the first time, predictable and universal relationships have been established between the expressive and communication processes, on the one hand, and social structure and culture pattern, on the other".

Gideon D'Arcangelo, a member of the Cantometrics team, described their work this way:

Using 37 criteria of observation, the Cantometrics team analyzed over 4,000 songs – around 10 representative songs from over 400 cultures. Each song profile they made was recorded on a computer punch-card and loaded onto the Columbia mainframe. A companion study of dance, Choreometrics, produced analyses of over 1,500 dance performances. Only a computer was capable of handling this enormous data set and looking for the patterns hidden within. The team, led by programmer Norman Berkowitz, developed a powerful set of statistically driven software tools to sort, separate, and group the performance data. Their analyses resulted in the first ever taxonomy of human performance style and in a series of maps showing the dis-semination of culture across the planet. These were presented to the American Association of Science (1966) and later published in the collaborative volume, Folk Song Style and Culture (1968).

== Results ==
The Cantometric study of song revealed strong statistical relations between song style and social norms. Alan Lomax stated that the Cantometrics analysis amply justified his original hypothesis that sexually restrictive and highly punitive societies correlated with degree of vocal tension. The tendency to sing together in groups, tonal cohesiveness, and the likelihood of polyphonic singing were all associated with fewer restrictions on women. Multipart singing occurs in societies where the sexes have a complementary relationship.

Other results included strong correlations between length of phrase and precision of articulation, and degree of ornamentation with social stratification. It was found that explicitness or the information load of song varies with the level of economic productivity of the subsistence system.

Murdock's taxonomy encoded the economic, social, and political features of more than 1,100 societies that ethnologists had studied up until that time. In many cases, these codes formed scales – for example, the one concerning the number of levels of political authority outside the local community, from 0 among hunters, to 4 for irrigation empires. Lomax and Arensberg arranged the codes into scales in order to measure the kinds of behaviors of features of culture, such as levels of production or permanence of settlement. When they added factors of expressive communication to the Murdock measures of social relations it produced a geographical taxonomy of human culture.

== Branching out into Choreometrics ==
Three chapters of Folk Song Style and Culture are devoted to Choreometrics. In chapter ten, "Dance, Style, and Culture," Lomax, Bartenieff, and Paulay describe the origin and meaning of the term: "In order to distinguish the level of this comparative study of movement from the levels where previous investigators have worked, we have given the method a freshly-coined designation, Choreometrics, meaning the measure of dance, or dance as a measure of culture." They wrote that:

Choreometrics tests the proposition that dance is the most repetitious, redundant, and formally organized system of body communication present in a culture... The dance is composed of those gestures, postures, movements, and movement qualities most characteristic and most essential to the activity of everyday, and thus crucial to cultural continuity. By treating these elements redundantly and formally, dance becomes an effective organizer of joint motor activity. Dance supplies the metronome to meter and regulates, or orders the energy and attention of groups of people, and thereby acquires the weight of general community approval. Thus dance functions to establish and renew consensus at moments when a society, without further discussion or explanation, is ready to act in concert.

Bartenieff believed that dance (particularly traditional dance) was uniquely suited to Lomax's type of analysis, since movement is "not only a medium of expression but also the essence of communication. Although all dancers feel intuitively that movement communicates across culture barriers, she wrote, there have hitherto been no means for describing dance patterns so that they could be consistently compared cross-culturally:

"The task on which we collaborated with Mr. Lomax was to adapt the Laban system to the problem of comparison of movement styles cross-culturally so that the main style families would emerge from the study of this visually perceived behavior on film, as in Cantometrics they had been found by study of aurally perceived behavior."

== Films ==
A series of short documentary films demonstrated some of the results of the team's statistical analysis in dramatic visual terms. These were: Dance & Human History (1974) (40 min.), which examined two important parameters in the Choreometric study, the dominant trace form of the movement and single/multiple articulation of the torso and relates them to geography and type of society; Palm Play (1977) (27 min.), which examines the use of the palm in dance cross culturally; Step Style (1977) (30 min.), which examines the use of the foot in dance cross culturally; and The Longest Trail (1984) (59 min.), which uses Choreometric data as evidence that the Americas were populated by Siberian hunters. In 2009 all four films were included on the DVD Rhythms of Earth: The Choreometrics Films of Alan Lomax and Forrestine Paulay produced by John Melville Bishop (Media-Generation, 1974–2008), which included old and new interviews with the original participants of the study. Improvisational jazz musician and composer Roswell Rudd later collaborated with Lomax and Paulay on an unpublished study called the Urban Strain that used Cantometric and Choreometric analysis to study commercially produced twentieth-century American popular music and dance.

== Criticisms and responses ==
The reaction of musicologists to Cantometrics was complex, as some critics questioned whether one could ever have enough statistics to prove anything about music and culture. One, Richard Middleton, called it an example of sociological homology.

The musical examples for Cantometrics had not been chosen randomly, however, but for their representativeness, following the scholarly guidance of specialists who had studied the regions and /or supplied the audio or film clip samples. This was done because it was found that style tends to be very repetitive, and in most instances relatively few examples captured the stable performance norms, so that in most cases, coding many examples per culture yielded little new information. Lomax and Grauer settled on about ten examples per culture for Cantometrics, which had the largest dataset. Ten examples per culture usually sufficed, although for some cultures one or more sub-styles needed to be sampled as well.

Alan Lomax himself stressed repeatedly that completeness of sampling was not the point:

The adequacy of any of these samples is . . . subject to this test: Will another sample of a similar kind taken in the same culture produce a similar performance profile? From this point of view, I believe that the majority of our samples will hold up. Even "secret" songs generally tend to be stylistically close to the more familiar music of a culture. The truth is that, with any one culture or subculture, singing is a rather standardized kind of behavior. It must be so since a main function of song is to . . . permit groups of performers to vocalize together and their listeners to share in a common experience. Cantometrics is a study of these standardized models, which describe singing rather than songs. Therefore, it is not primarily concerned with "complete" collections and descriptions, as are most scholarly endeavors, but with locating verifiable regularities and patterns. (Lomax [1968] 2000).

Victor Grauer noted that: “Cantometrics is a statistical method. Its patterns and correlations are based on multiple instances, not just one. There will always be exceptions, which is why statistical methods are generally preferable for comparative studies than the close examination of individual examples.”

== Cantometrics as an educational tool ==
The Cantometrics team also created a set of teaching tapes that make it easy to develop an understanding of world music and to create new song profiles. “Cantometrics helps you to break music down into its parts,” Roswell Rudd told Gideon D’Arcangelo. “You want to know how it’s put together and then you want to know where the parts came from. The Cantometrics teaching tapes are the best thing anybody can use who wants to understand world music, classical music, pop music, whatever. That teaching kit teaches you about the qualities of music – any kind of music from any culture.” Alan Lomax foresaw that computers would be an ideal way to make Cantometrics analysis available not just to scholars but to people of all ages and educational backgrounds, particularly school children. With that end in view, during the 1990s he developed The Global Jukebox, an interactive multi-media computer program designed for classrooms, museums, and libraries to visually and aurally map the world's song and dance cultures, incidentally helping people understand their own roots and those of others, while teaching geography, anthropology, and tolerance through song and dance. Since Alan Lomax's death in 2002, The Association for Cultural Equity, which Lomax founded, has been working to update the program, and make it widely available. In fulfillment of this project, as of March 2012 all the recordings of his Archive will be streamed online.
