= Brent Hayes Edwards =

Comparative literature scholar

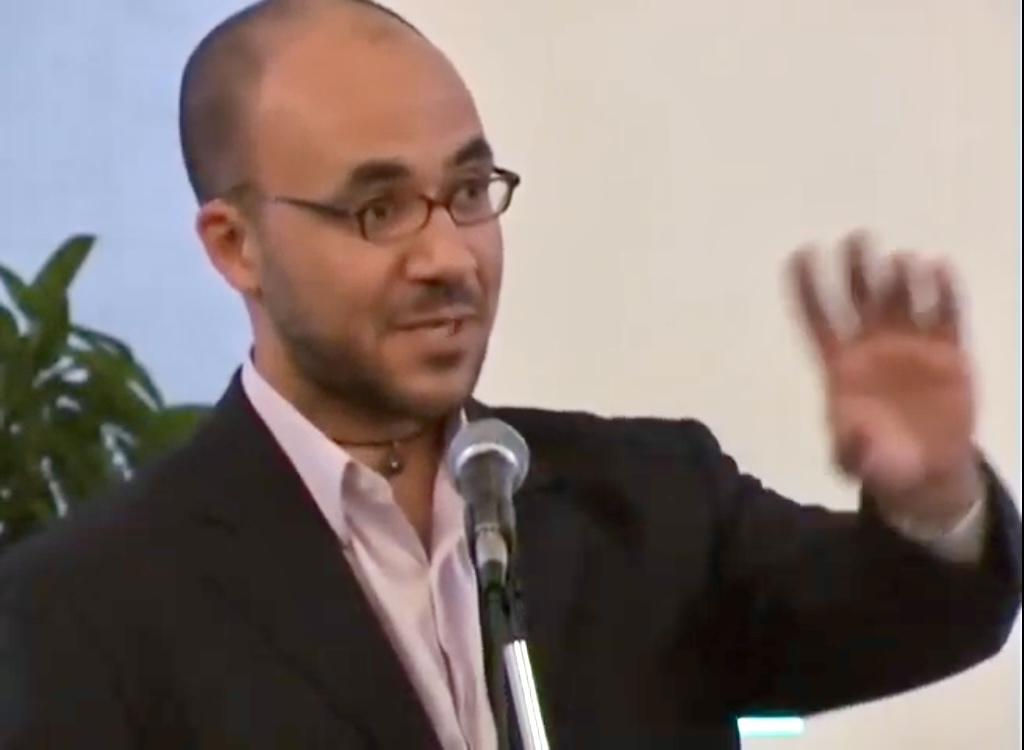
- Edwards in 2009
- Education: Yale University (BA); Columbia University (MA, PhD)
- Occupation: Academic
- Employer: Columbia University
- Notable work: The Practice of Diaspora: Literature, Translation, and the Rise of Black Internationalism
- Awards: Guggenheim Fellowship

Brent Hayes Edwards is a professor of English and comparative literature at Columbia University.

== Early life ==
Edwards attended Yale University as an undergraduate, then completed an MA and PhD at Columbia.

== Career ==
=== Teaching ===
Edwards has taught at Rutgers University and now at Columbia, as well as Cornell University's summer graduate program, the School of Criticism and Theory, and the Dartmouth College summer graduate program The Futures of American Studies.

=== Scholarship ===
Edwards's first book is The Practice of Diaspora: Literature, Translation, and the Rise of Black Internationalism (Harvard University Press, 2003). It examines black writers in the interwar period, focusing on sites of interaction between Anglophone and Francophone black writers to develop an argument about the generative potential of translation, specifically in the black diaspora. Among other influences, Edwards draws on Stuart Hall's use of the concept of articulation to develop a theoretical use of the French term décalage, "referring to a shift in space or time or the gap that results from it...[Edwards argues] that these disparate locations are, like joints, sites of potential forward motion."

Edwards also edited the collection Uptown Conversation: The New Jazz Studies (Columbia University Press, 2004) with Farah Griffin and Robert G. O'Meally.

In 2009, Edwards edited a new printing of W. E. B. Du Bois's The Souls of Black Folk from Oxford University Press.

Edwards serves on the editorial boards of Callaloo and Transition.

In 2023, Edwards co-wrote and edited the autobiography of jazz musician Henry Threadgill, Easily Slip into Another World: A Life in Music.

=== Claude McKay manuscript discovery ===
In 2009, Edwards's graduate student Jean-Christophe Cloutier discovered a manuscript in Columbia's Rare Book and Manuscript Library in the papers of writer Samuel Roth. In 2012, Edwards and Cloutier, in consultation with other experts and after examining archival materials and personal correspondence, authenticated the manuscript as a previously unknown 1941 work by Claude McKay, called Amiable With Big Teeth: A Novel of the Love Affair Between the Communists and the Poor Black Sheep of Harlem. Henry Louis Gates, who served as one of the experts evaluating the manuscript's authenticity, called it a "major discovery...It dramatically expands the canon of novels written by Harlem Renaissance writers."

=== Awards ===
In 2004, Edwards's book The Practice of Diaspora won the John Hope Franklin Prize from the American Studies Association and the Gilbert Chinard Prize of the Society for French Historical Studies, and an honorable mention for the James Russell Lowell Prize of the Modern Language Association.

In 2005, Edwards won the New York Public Library's Dorothy and Lewis B. Cullman Fellowship, to spend one year researching a project on jazz in New York in the 1970s.

In 2015, Edwards was awarded a Guggenheim Fellowship to pursue a book project entitled "The Art of the Lecture".

In 2024 he received a PEN Oakland – Josephine Miles Award for Easily Slip into Another World: A Life in Music, coauthored with Henry Threadgill.
