= John Melville Bishop =

American documentary filmmaker

John Melville Bishop (born April 4, 1946, in North Dakota) is a contemporary, U.S., documentary filmmaker known for the breadth of his collaborations, primarily in the fields of anthropology and folklore. He has worked with Alan Lomax, John Marshall, and extensively with the Human Studies Film Archive at the Smithsonian Institution and the American Folklife Center at the Library of Congress. In 2005, he received a Lifetime Achievement Award from the Society for Visual Anthropology.

== Career ==
Known for the grace of his camera work and editing, Bishop "has worked as a free-lance cameraman, editor, archivist, and writer in Africa, the Himalayas, the South Pacific, the Caribbean, and most of the United States. He collaborated with Alan Lomax and Worth Long on The Land Where the Blues Began (1979) and with John Marshall, spending several months in 1989 shooting film footage for Marshall's six-hour ethnographic film series, A Kalahari Family. In the 1980s, Bishop oversaw the accession of Marshall's Kalahari footage for Documentary Educational Resources and the Human Studies Film Archives at the Smithsonian. In 1994, he produced and edited a revised edition of the 26-part anthropology telecourse, Faces of Culture. He produced and directed Oh, What a Blow That Phantom Gave Me: Edmund Carpenter (2002) with Harald Prins, a documentary that takes its title from Edmund Snow Carpenter's visionary 1972 book on media ecology and includes never-before-released footage from Carpenter's 1969-70 fieldwork in Papua New Guinea, as well as interviews with Carpenter discussing the "now-famous 'culture and communication' project" he launched in the 1950s with his close friend Marshall McLuhan. For his film In the Wilderness of a Troubled Genre, "Bishop interviewed most of the great figures of ethnographic film" over a ten-year period to "constitute a wonderfully varied take on the role of documentary film in anthropology". He is quoted extensively in Cross-Cultural Filmmaking (1997) by Ilisa Barbash and Lucien Castaing-Taylor and provided several of the photographs included in the book.

Bishop founded Media-Generation, as a documentary production company and umbrella for production services and, in 2001, began producing and distributing DVDs with the goal of including contextual information—such as extra footage, filmmaker interviews, transcripts, and scholarly articles—alongside specific folklore and ethnographic film titles. Through Media-Generation, Bishop published DVDs of Lomax's four Choreometrics films (see Cantometrics), producing contextualizing videos and texts included on the DVD; re-engaging the 1951 Lomax film, Oss Oss Wee Oss in the DVD release Oss Tales (2007); and restoring Lomax's unreleased 1961 house concert film Ballads, Blues, and Bluegrass.

From 2011 to 2016, Bishop worked with historians on the Civil Rights History Project, shooting 130 on-location oral histories with veterans of the U.S. Civil Rights Movement for the Smithsonian Institution Museum of African American History and Culture, the American Folklife Center at the Library of Congress, and the Southern Oral History Project at the University of North Carolina.

From 1995 to 2008, Bishop taught courses in video production, choreography and the camera, ethnographic film, and visual thinking in the Department of World Arts and Cultures at the University of California, Los Angeles (UCLA). He supervised numerous video and research projects at the Pacific Arts Festival, including 14 students in Western Samoa (1996), 8 students in New Caledonia (2000), and 13 students in Palau (2004). While at UCLA, he also served as Director of the Video Lab (2002–2004) for the School of Arts and Architecture and as Video Director at the Center for Digital Arts (1999–2002) where he designed, built, and maintained a lab of tape and non-linear editing systems.

== Films ==
- 2021: Winston Fleary and the Big Drum Nation Dance
- 2012: In the Wilderness of a Troubled Genre
- 2011: Further Lane, with Edmund Snow Carpenter
- 2007: Oss Tales with Sabina Magliocco
- 2006: Seasons of Migration, with Sophiline Cheam Shapiro
- 2002: Oh What a Blow That Phantom Gave Me: Edmund Snow Carpenter, with Harald Prins
- 2001: Cambodian Court Dance: The Next Generation, with Sam-Ang Sam
- 1998: Hosay Trinidad, with Frank Koram
- 1997: Himalayan Herders, with Naomi Hawes Bishop
- 1992: Khmer Court Dance, with Sam-Ang Sam
- 1990: New England Dances, with Nick Hawes
- 1989: The Last Window Charles Jay Connick
- 1986: Hand Play
- 1984: New England Fiddles, with Nick Hawes
- 1979: The Land Where the Blues Began, with Alan Lomax and Worth Long
- 1978: Yoyo Man

== Books ==
- 1991 California Artists: At the Crossroads, Sacramento, CA : Published for the California Arts Council, Traditional Folk Arts Program by Media-Generation
- 1988 Making It in Video: An Insider's Guide to Careers in the Fast Growing Industry of the Decade, New York : McGraw-Hill
- 1985 Home Video Production: Getting the Most from Your Video Equipment, New York : McGraw-Hill
- 1980 Making Home Video, New York: Wideview Books
- 1978 An Ever-Changing Place: A Year Among Snow Monkeys and Sherpas in the Himalayas. New York: Simon & Schuster.

== Selected articles ==
- 2014 "Notes from the Wilderness," American Anthropologist, 116(3), 650–651.
- 2005 "Dead Birds Migrating: DVD Reinvigorates Classic Ethnographic Film," American Anthropologist, 107(3), 475–484.
- 2002 "Edmund Carpenter: Explorations In Media & Anthropology", (with Harald Prins). Visual Anthropology Review, 17(2).
- 2002 "Alan Lomax (1915-2002): A Remembrance", Visual Anthropology Review, 17(2).
- 2002 "The Camera as Choreographer in Documentary and Ethnographic Film," in Envisioning Dance on Film and Video (Judy Mitoma, ed.), New York: Routledge
- 2002 "Alan Lomax and Choreometrics," in Envisioning Dance on Film and Video (Judy Mitoma, ed.), New York: Routledge.
- 1993 "Hot Footage/Cold Storage: The Marshall Ju/'hoa Bushman Archive," in The Cinema of John Marshall (Jay Ruby, ed.), Philadelphia: Harwood Academic Publishers.
