= The Practice of Diaspora =

The Practice of Diaspora: Literature, Translation, and the Rise of Black Internationalism
- Author: Brent Hayes Edwards
- Language: English
- Subject: Harlem Renaissance, Négritude, African-American literature, translation
- Genre: Literary history, literary criticism, literary theory
- Publisher: Harvard University Press
- Publication date: July 2003
- Publication place: United States
- Pages: 408
- ISBN: 9780674011038
- Website: http://www.hup.harvard.edu/catalog.php?isbn=9780674011038

The Practice of Diaspora: Literature, Translation, and the Rise of Black Internationalism is a 2003 book on literary history, criticism and theory by Brent Hayes Edwards.

== History ==
Edwards published The Practice of Diaspora with Harvard University Press in 2003.

== Subject matter ==
The Practice of Diaspora focuses on black writers in the interwar period. "Retracing the encounters between black intellectuals from both the Anglophone and the Francophone world in Paris, during the early to middle decades of the twentieth century, Edwards is able to make broader theoretical and historical claims for the role of translation in shaping black diasporic cultures." Edwards examines works by Alain Locke, René Maran, Claude McKay, and Paulette Nardal among others. W.E.B. DuBois serves as a point of departure for this transnational examination of black print culture. Edwards observes that DuBois first presented his famed argument, "The problem of the twentieth century is the problem of the color line," not in his landmark 1903 text, The Souls of Black Folk (the usual attribution for that quotation), but in fact three years prior, at the 1900 Pan-African Congress in London, explicitly framing the "color line" as an issue and a dialogue that crossed national boundaries.

In addition to the DuBois reference, Edwards also draws on Stuart Hall and the concept of articulation to develop a theoretical use of the French word décalage,

referring to a shift in space or time or the gap that results from it, and applies the term to describe the way in which members of the black diaspora share similar conditions of oppression yet often find ourselves on opposite ends of the political spectrum—for example, black writers seeking solace from Jim Crow in Paris, while simultaneously Africans were struggling against French colonialism. These countering political locations create tensions within our diaspora, but Edwards does not see these sites of difference as global movement killer...[instead] that these disparate locations are, like joints, sites of potential forward motion.

== Reception ==
=== Reviews ===
The Practice of Diaspora received widely favorable reviews. In Modern Fiction Studies, Michelle Stephens wrote, "With The Practice of Diaspora: Literature, Translation, and the Rise of Black Internationalism, Brent Edwards has changed the very landscape of transnational black studies, showing what we have lost by not developing a more multilingual approach to black cultural studies and texts." Writing in Crisis Magazine, Angela Ards said Edwards

"has been hailed as one of the most promising emerging scholars of African American letters. His debut book, The Practice of Diaspora: Literature, Translation, and the Rise of Black Internationalism, does not disappoint. In its path-breaking take on Black print culture of the 1920s, a decade that witnessed the Harlem Renaissance and the Négritude Movement, The Practice of Diaspora recalls David Levering Lewis' seminal history When Harlem Was In Vogue, while declaring Edwards' brilliance as a literary scholar in his own right."

=== Awards ===
For The Practice of Diaspora, Edwards won the John Hope Franklin Prize from the American Studies Association and the Gilbert Chinard Prize of the Society for French Historical Studies, and an honorable mention for the James Russell Lowell Prize of the Modern Language Association.
