= Folksong '59 =

Upon his return to New York in 1959 after a nearly a decade spent based in London, UK, Alan Lomax produced a concert, Folksong '59, in New York City's Carnegie Hall, featuring Arkansas singer Jimmy Driftwood; the Selah Jubilee Singers and Drexel Singers (gospel groups); Muddy Waters and Memphis Slim (blues); Earl Taylor and the Stoney Mountain Boys (bluegrass); Pete Seeger, Mike Seeger (urban folk revival); and The Cadillacs (a rock and roll group).

The occasion marked the first time bluegrass was performed on the Carnegie Hall stage. "The time has come for Americans not to be ashamed of what we go for, musically, from primitive ballads to rock 'n' roll songs," Lomax told the audience. According to Izzy Young, owner of the Folklore Center, and chronicler of the Greenwich Village folk music scene, the audience booed when Alan Lomax told them to lay down their prejudices and listen to rock 'n' roll.

In Young's opinion, "Lomax put on what is probably the turning point in American folk music . . . . At that concert, the point he was trying to make was that Negro and white music were mixing, and rock and roll was that thing."

According to Tina Aridas, writing in the DC Bluegrass Union:

That night back in April of 1959 when Earl Taylor and the Stoney Mountain Boys played Carnegie Hall (along with Muddy Waters and Memphis Slim, Jimmy Driftwood, and Mike and Pete Seeger, among others). Curtis Cody, who was guesting on fiddle for the Baltimore-based bluegrass band, peeked through the curtains before the start of the show. The elegant hall was packed with Northern folk-music fans, as the first bluegrass group ever to perform at the elegant and historic concert hall — more accustomed to playing in bars in and around Baltimore — paced nervously backstage.

Curtis turned to banjo player Walter Hensley and said, "Walt, I don't think they'll like us a bit." Walt recalls that his legs "were like Jell-O - and we had to play the fastest song we knew." But when Walt, with legs shaking, stepped out onto the stage before the assembled audience at Alan Lomax's Folksong '59 concert, Curtis recalls that "he played something on the banjo, and they tore that place up." Curtis Cody wasn't alone in his assessment of the band's performance and the crowd's reaction. "There is true folk magic in every note Walt plays," according to Alan Lomax. Neil V. Rosenberg, in his book Bluegrass: A History, reports that "all agreed that of the various groups in the concert, Earl Taylor and the Stoney Mountain Boys were the hit of the evening." Years later in an article in Bluegrass Unlimited by Tom Ewing, Earl Taylor recalled, "When we would end a number, I knew that it would take five minutes before we could go into another one — that was how much rarin' and screamin' and hair-pullin' there was". The recording of that concert, released as an LP later that year on United Artists (Folksong Festival at Carnegie Hall, UAL 3049), influenced a generation of young musicians and new fans, many from urban areas in the North who were exposed to bluegrass for the first time.

== Internet Resources ==
- | Tina Aridas, "Walter Hensley: The Banjo Baron of Baltimore" (Sept. 19, 2010), DC Bluegrass Union.
