= Lomax the Songhunter =

2004 film by Rogier Kappers

- Directed by: Rogier Kappers
- Written by: Rogier Kappers
- Cinematography: Adri Schrover, Eugène van den Bosch
- Edited by: Jos Driessen
- Release date: 2004
- Country: United States
- Language: English

Lomax the Songhunter is a 2004 documentary film about Alan Lomax, a man who, after World War II, was determined to record folk music from United States and all over the world before it was blown away by mass consumer culture. Son of John Lomax, the man who discovered Lead Belly (and bailed him out of prison) and introduced Woody Guthrie to the world, Alan shared his father's passion for music and was not intimidated by his massive accomplishments. The film, which finds Alan near death and barely able to make himself understood, traces Alan's journey across the globe, stopping to hear testimonials from many of the people or relatives of the people he recorded. It also contains interviews from Lomax's friends and colleagues, including Pete Seeger, who did some cataloging for Lomax.

Lomax the Songhunter was written and directed by Rogier Kappers and aired on PBS's Point of View series in 2006.
