= Articulation (sociology) =

In sociology, articulation labels the process by which particular classes appropriate cultural forms and practices for their own use. The term appears to have originated from the work of Antonio Gramsci, specifically from his conception of superstructure. Chantal Mouffe, Stuart Hall, and others have adopted or used it.

== Overview ==
Articulation theorizes the relationship between components of social formation or the relationship between cultural and political economy. In this theory, cultural forms and practices (Antonio Gramsci's superstructure and Richard Middleton's instance or level of practice) have relative autonomy; socio-economic structures of power do not determine them, but rather they relate to them. "The theory of articulation recognizes the complexity of cultural fields. It preserves a relative autonomy for cultural and ideological elements ... but also insists that those combinatory patterns that are actually constructed do mediate deep, objective patterns in the socio-economic formation, and that the mediation takes place in struggle: the classes fight to articulate together constituents of the cultural repe[r]toire in particular ways so that they are organized in terms of principles or sets of values determined by the position and interests of the class in the prevailing mode of production."

This is because "the relationship between actual culture...on the one hand, and economically determined factors such as class position, on the other, is always problematical, incomplete, and the object of ideological work and struggle. ... Cultural relationships and cultural change are thus not predetermined; rather they are the product of negotiation, imposition, resistance, transformation, and so on....Thus particular cultural forms and practices cannot be attached mechanically or even paradigmatically to particular classes; nor, even, can particular interpretations, valuations, and uses of a single form or practice. In Stuart Hall's words (1981: 238), 'there are no wholly separate "cultures"...attached, in a relation of historical fixity, to specific "whole" classes'. However, "while elements of culture are not directly, eternally, or exclusively tied to specific economically determined factors such as class position, they are determined in the final instance by such factors, through the operation of articulating principles which are tied to class position".

Articulating principles "operate by combining existing elements into new patterns or by attaching new connotations to them". Examples of these processes in musical culture include the re-use of elements of bourgeois marches in labor anthems or the assimilation of liberated (in the Marcusian sense) countercultural 1960s rock into a tradition of bourgeois bohemianism and the combination of elements of black and white working-class music with elements of art music that created countercultural 1960s rock.

Some scholars may prefer the theory of articulation, where "class does not coincide with the sign community", to the theory of homology, where class does coincide with the sign community and where economic forces determine the superstructure. However, "it seems likely that some signifying structures are more easily articulated to the interests of one group than are some others" and cross-connotation, "when two or more different elements are made to connote, symbolize, or evoke each other", can set up "particularly strong articulative relationships". For example: Elvis Presley's linking of elements of "youth rebellion, working-class 'earthiness', and ethnic 'roots', each of which can evoke the others, all of which were articulated together, however briefly, by a moment of popular self-assertion".
