= Sam-Ang Sam =

Sam-Ang Sam សំ សំអាង
- Born: January 8, 1950 (age 76)
- Education: Connecticut College (BA, 1983); Connecticut College (MA, 1985); Wesleyan University (PhD, 1988)
- Member of: Apsara Ensemble; Sam-Ang Sam Ensemble

Sam-Ang Sam (Khmer: សំ សំអាង, Sâm Sâm’ang) is a Cambodian-American ethnomusicologist and 1994 recipient of a MacArthur Fellowship and a National Endowment for the Arts Fellowship (as part of the Apsara Ensemble) in 1998.

Sam-Ang Sam and his wife Chan Moly Sam spent "more than two decades" (as of 1993) "performing, teaching, researching, and documenting" their native country's music and dances. Having studied in Cambodia, they were in the Philippines when the Khmer Rouge took over Cambodia in 1975, and escaped the genocide that killed an estimated 90 percent of the country's musicians. He and his wife moved to the United States, and Sam-Ang got his doctorate in ethnomusicology in 1998 from Wesleyan University. He and his wife performed in various locations in the United States the between 1979 and 2005 with a dance troupe of Cambodian dancers. Their own performing troupe was called the Apsara Ensemble.

As founder of Sam-Ang Sam Ensemble, he has released several albums for sale in mainstream American markets in an attempt to revive Classical Khmer music and stimulate interest in the various Cambodian performing arts.

== Recordings and video ==
- Sam, Sam-Ang (1987). Traditional music of Cambodia. Conservatoire National des Spectacles. Wedding Ensemble. Middletown, CT: Center for the Study of Khmer Culture. OCLC 18887768.
- Sam-Ang Sam Ensemble (1996). Echoes from the palace. Chapel Hill, N.C.: Music of the World. OCLC 35685707.
- Sam-Ang Sam Ensemble (1999). Mohori: Khmer Music from Cambodia. Chapel Hill, N.C.: Music of the World. OCLC 896688142.
- Sam, Sam-Ang; Bishop, John Melville (2001). Cambodian court dances : the next generation. Cambodian Network Council; Media Generation. West Hills, CA: Media Generation. OCLC 54075479.

== Print publications ==
- Sam, Sam-Ang (1988). The pin peat ensemble : its history, music and context. Ann Arbor, Michigan: UMI. OCLC 422852505. Dissertation: Ph.D., Wesleyan University, Conn. 1988
- Sam, Sam-Ang; Campbell, Patricia Shehan (1991). Silent temples, songful hearts : traditional music of Cambodia. Yang Sam and Tho "Tony" Sangphet (illustraters); Bonnie Periale (photographer) et al. Danbury, CT: World Music Press, cop. OCLC 924801597.
- Catlin, Amy (1992). Khmer classical dance songbook. Ghan Moly Sam (Khmer orthography handwriting); Sam-Ang Sam, Chan Moly Sam, and Amy Catlin (translators); Amy Catlin (musical transcriptions and glossary); Sophiline Cheam Shapiro (foreword). Van Nuys: Apsara media for intercultural education. OCLC 963260981. Musical score (Khmer)
- Sam, Sam-Ang (2002). "Musical instruments of Cambodia". Senri Ethnological Reports (29). Osaka: National Museum of Ethnology.
- Sam-Ang Sam; Ṅuan Saṃqāt; Ath Nguon Sam (c. 2002). ការបង្ហាញពីរបៀបសំពះខ្មែរ [Khmer salutation]. សមាគមវប្បខមែរ. title transcription as Kār paṅhāñ bī rapiap saṃbaḥ khmaer.
- Sam-ang Sam; Yun Khean; Chhim Naline (2010). Paññāsāstra University of Cambodia (ed.). Music in the lives of the indigenous ethnic groups in northeast Cambodia. University Press.
