= Anton Blok =

Dutch anthropologist (1935–2024)

Anton Blok (15 February 1935 – 24 June 2024) was a Dutch anthropologist, famous for studying the Mafia in Sicily in 1960s. Anton Blok was a visiting associate professor at the University of Michigan (1972–73) and the University of California, Berkeley in 1988. From 1973 until 1986, he served as full professor of cultural anthropology at Radboud University, Nijmegen. He then accepted a chair at the University of Amsterdam, where he remained until his retirement. For that occasion, thirty of his international colleagues and former students contributed essays in his honor, an edited volume titled as Miniature Etnografiche (SUN, 2000). Later a professor emeritus at U Amsterdam, Dr. Blok also spent one semester at Yale as a fellow. Blok died on 24 June 2024, at the age of 89.

== Select bibliography ==
- The Mafia of a Sicilian Village, 1860-1960: A Study of Violent Peasant Entrepreneurs. Harper & Row, 1974. ISBN 0-631-19960-8
- De Bokkerijders: Roversbenden en geheime genootschappen in de Landen van Overmaas (1730–1774). Amsterdam: Prometheus, 1991.
- Honour and Violence. Cambridge: Polity, 2001. ISBN 0-7456-0449-8
- Anthropologische Perspektiven: Einführung, Kritik und Plädoyer. With Klaus Schomburg. Stuttgart: Klett-Cotta, 1995. ISBN 3-608-91725-X
- De Vernieuwers: De Zegeningen van Tegenslag in Wetenschap en Kunst, 1500–2000. Amsterdam: Prometheus, 2013.
