= Richard Middleton (musicologist) =

British musicologist

Richard Middleton is Emeritus Professor of Music at Newcastle University in Newcastle upon Tyne. He is also the founder and co-ordinating editor of the journal Popular Music.

== Education ==
Middleton studied at Clare College, Cambridge and at the University of York, where his PhD was supervised by Wilfrid Mellers.

== Career ==
Middleton previously taught at the University of Birmingham and the Open University. He was appointed to his position at Newcastle in 1998.

In 2004, Middleton was elected to a Fellowship by the British Academy.

Middleton retired from his post at Newcastle in 2005.

== Bibliography ==
=== Author ===
- Pop Music and the Blues: A Study of the Relationship and Its Significance. London: Gollancz, 1972. ISBN 0-575-01442-3.
- Studying Popular Music. Philadelphia: Open University Press, 1990. ISBN 0-335-15276-7.
- Voicing the Popular: On the Subjects of Popular Music. London: Routledge, 2006. ISBN 978-0-415-97590-2.

=== Editor or co-editor ===
- Reading Pop. Oxford University Press, 2000. ISBN 0-19-816612-5
- Clayton, Martin, Trevor Herbert, and Richard Middleton, eds. The Cultural Study of Music: A Critical Introduction. London: Routledge, 2003. ISBN 0-415-93844-9
