= The Medium Is the Massage (album) =

Album by Marshall McLuhan

Studio album by Marshall McLuhan
- Released: July 1967
- Genre: Sound collage; spoken word; lecture; postmodern; psychedelia
- Length: 42:36
- Label: Columbia
- Producer: John Simon

The Medium Is the Massage is an album by Canadian media philosopher Marshall McLuhan, released in July 1967 by Columbia Records. It is the audio companion to the book of the same name, co-authored by McLuhan with Quentin Fiore, which explores the subconscious effects of mass media on the global psyche. The record was produced by John Simon of Columbia, who took creative control of the recording, and co-ordinated by Jerome Agel.

Based on a script written by McLuhan, Fiore and Agel, the record is a sound collage that features McLuhan reading prose set to a cacophonous array of sound effects, voices and musical snippets. To create the collage, Simon and Agel used razors to cut pieces of magnetic tape and splice and overlay samples across each other in surreal permutations. The record specifically examines sound as a format of expression and experience separate from books, as per McLuhan's central theory that 'the medium is the message'. According to Agel, the record was intended to be as played like a pop album.

After the record's release, Columbia organized an elaborate promotional plan, involving advertisements in an eclectic array of publications and a unique campaign which saw female models in miniskirts outside media centres in American cities carrying posters of the album and giving free copies to passers-by. The record drew critical attention for its unique content, and was a success throughout the late 1960s on FM radio. More recently, critics have described as prophetic, due to McLuhan's comments on global communication, and the parallels between the cacophonous nature of the collage and the Information Age.

== Background and recording ==
The Medium Is the Massage is based on the best-selling 1967 book of the same name, co-authored by cultural and media commentator Marshall McLuhan with Quentin Fiore. The book explores McLuhan's theories of communication and media saturation, expressed through a combination of stylised text and graphics. According to Cash Box, the book and album title is "both a pun on McLuhan's central thesis that the 'medium is the message' and an observation concerning the effects of mass media." The album, recorded for Columbia Records, was the final spin-off product to the Massage book; already it had been "refashioned" into the fourth issue of Aspen magazine (which included a Gordon Mumma flexidisc, a poster of John Cage and page proofs from McLuhan's book), and the tie-in NBC documentary special, This Is Marshall McLuhan (March 1967). The album does not repeat the contents of the Massage book, instead using a special script derived from it; this was written by McLuhan, Fiore and Jerome Agel. The album was conceived and co-ordinated by Agel and produced and supervised by Columbia producer John Simon. Record World wrote that the album was recorded "live" by Columbia, with "members of the press actually participating in the recording session."

Having worked at Columbia since 1963, Simon had established himself by the recording of Massage and was "given full creative control of the project". According to author Phil Ford, Simon clearly wanted the record to "represent the subjective experience of human beings in the media age that McLuhan envisioned–a total immersion in discontinuous, simultaneous, and rapidly changing multisensory inputs." To this end, it employs the use of multimedia collage, which was fashionable at the time. To build the sonic collages that form the album's "proverbial kitchen sink of sound", Simon and Agel used razorblades, magnetic tape and reel-to-reel machines, overdubbing snippets of sound "atop and across one another". In music writer Oliver Wang's description, the record was created by "taking a razor to hundreds of yards of reel-to-reel tape, spliced and overdubbed together in chaotic permutations". Simon scored the musical interludes, manipulated hundreds of audio snippets and arranged them with liberal use of stereo effects, with juxtaposed, overlapping samples appearing in opposite channels. McLuhan supposedly recorded his parts first without any knowledge of what Agel and Simon would eventually create, a process that Wang considered to "honor the theorist's ideas; McLuhan was always interested in the participatory potential of emergent media forms."

== Composition ==
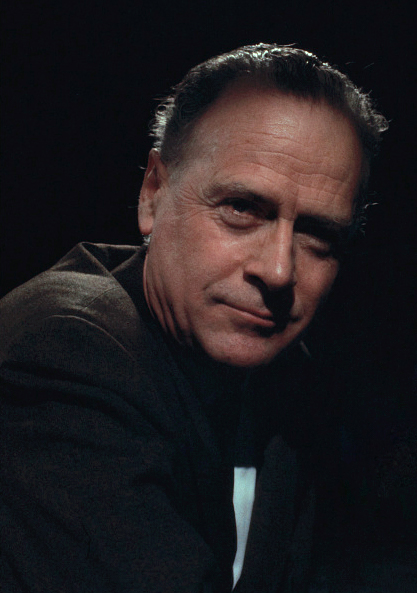
Marshall McLuhan in 1967

The Medium Is a Massage presents McLuhan reading prose over a range of sound effects, described by author Alex Kitnick as "a discordant landscape of sonic clangs and bangs, backwards guitars, and commercial jingles", using novel sound techniques to "demonstrate McLuhan's theories concerning the effects of the electronic age." The record's use of "cut-up sound collage" channels what Kitnick calls "a developing sense of allatonceness" and highlights the significance of auditory space to McLuhan's theories. Cash Box wrote that the book excerpts are complemented with several added "comments, statements and questions", and an array of sound effects to convey the "essence" of McLuhan's commentary, adding that: "Like the book, the album is intended to be not only informative, but also entertaining." Sound excerpts that can be heard among the album's 'cacophony' include a reading of Homer's Iliad, snippets of jazz, broken pottery and chirping birds. (Note: Other sounds include the sly comment "John? John who?", inserted by Simon, and what Greil Marcus of Artforum calls it a "a crowlike voice squawking out, 'The medium is the massage! The medium is the massage!' over and over.") McLuhan's spoken text forms a "conceptual basso continuo" as it provides a fixed pointed of reference.

Agel stated that the album "is designed for young people. It is designed to be a 40-minute interface–it is designed to be heard again and again and again and again and again, like a pop record." Jack Curtis Dubowsky calls it a "spoken word and sound collage album", while Glenn Willmott describes it as "part postmodern sound collage and part McLuhan lecture." Ford calls it "a pop-art audio collage version" of the book and compares it to the John Benson Brooks Trio's Avant Slant (1968), which also tiles together similar sounds into random-sounding arrangements as a representation of the media age, although he writes that Massage "layers its audio elements much more densely, distorts its sounds, and foregrounds the materiality of its recording media. And the strata of sounds transform at different times and rates".

Author Grant Bollmer writes how an array of recordings, voices and effects are fused into a sound collage, with "McLuhan's voice modulated throughout". He believes it to be an example of offbeat 1960s psychedelia that uses audio to "examine the material possibilities of sound as a means of expression and experience. The message isn't found in the meaning of the words McLuhan speaks, but the specific ways of listening and presenting information an audio recording makes possible–and how that differs from what a book makes possible." Similarly, music critic Brett Milano calls it a collage of "voices, effects, and library music that mixes profundity, non sequiturs, and just plain strangeness at will", and believes it to be the only possible album version of McLuhan's book, which was heavy on typographical quirks including "pages printed backward"; he added that as McLuhan's subject is "the subconscious effects of media saturation on the global psyche, the structure of the album – with its TV interference, snatches of cartoon music, and various sped-up and slowed-down voices – was entirely fitting."

== Release and reception ==
The Medium is the Massage was released in July 1967 by Columbia, shortly after the publication of McLuhan's book. To promote the album following its release, the label devised an unusual, diversified advertising campaign; Columbia's general manager, Clive Davis, stated that The Medium is the Massage is "an innovation in recording. It is both informative and humorous and could be described as a fun package which offers a new way of learning or as the first happening ever released on records. We plan to advertise and promote the album in keeping with this concept." To this end, advertisements for the album appeared in a diverse array of publications such as The New York Times, Advertising Age, Evergreen Review and Saturday Review, while a special promotion saw women in miniskirts standing outside broadcasting and advertising centres in New York, Boston, Chicago, Los Angeles and San Francisco, carrying large advertising posters depicting the album sleeve and giving out complimentary copies of the record to passers-by. (Note: One advert for the album read: "SOUND AFFECTS. As no visual medium can. That's why books may soon be obsolete. Marshall McLuhan says so. In his book." According to author Justin St. Clair, the quirky irreverence of this advert underscored the "bookish anxiety" that was to become typical of multiple "multimedia releases" over the coming decades.) At a Columbia-sponsored event in Boston, the models gave copies of the LP to ten winners of a competition, while in Los Angeles, copies were presents as door prizes at the Publicity Club. The 'miniskirt' campaign garnered coverage in The New York Times and other newspapers.

In their contemporary review, Billboard called it "an unusual record" that interweaves, repeats and satirizes its sounds, messages and music, and commented that McLuhan's popularity in literary circles has the potential to secure strong sales for the album, adding that it would appeal to "the campus crowd". Cash Box called it a "humorous and thought-provoking album" documenting McLuhan's opinions on mass media, and predicted that it would sell well. Another reviewer, Douglas Watt of the Daily News, dubbed it a record version of McLuhan's and Fiore's "souped-up" book, with the two authors reading excerpts "with other voices and all kind of sound-effects participating." The album received Top 40 airplay in Boston, Los Angeles, San Francisco and St. Louis, while its trippy style ensured that it was a fixture on FM radio in the late 1960s. John Benson Brooks, whose similar album Avant Slant was still in production when Massage was released, expressed his annoyance in July 1967, saying of McLuhan's record: "not bad, but not very good either. Music, comedy, electr. sounds, poetry, lecture on the age & history of the Mediums of communication–he beat us to it though! Pain in the ass–(they'll say I took his idea!)"

== Legacy ==
Professional ratings
Review scores
Source	Rating
AllMusic	4/5 stars

According to Wilmott, the Massage album was the "high point" of McLuhan's "real media dissemination" in 1967; he was adopted as a pop philosopher in the record, radio and television industries and was frequently referenced on television in this period. The Band chose John Simon to produce their debut album, Music from Big Pink (1968), based on his production of The Medium Is the Massage. Musician Taj Mahal found McLuhan's album to be "so dense", and he would "[listen] first to the left channel and then to the right channel separately"; shortly after the album's release, he hired Simon for his touring band. According to Milano, the album's "disorienting production style" and "similar surreal humor" soon appeared on Frank Zappa's Lumpy Gravy (1968), the Monkees' Head (1968), the Beatles' "Revolution 9" (1968) and the "entire catalog" of the Firesign Theatre.

The Medium Is the Massage was re-released on CD in 1999 and 2017 by Sony Music and in 2011 by Five Day Music. In his retrospective review for AllMusic, Milano referred to The Medium Is the Massage as "a one-of-a-kind album: a trance remix of a lecture." He commented that the album remained confusing and fascinating, and considered some of McLuhan's comments on global resources throughout the record to be strikingly prophetic. In 2013, Spin ranked the album at number 100 in their list of "The Top 100 Alternative Albums of the 1960s"; contributor Oliver Wang described the LP as less an album than "a proto-mixtape", calling it a "strange, literally and figuratively loopy attempt" at presenting McLuhan's ideas through audio. He considered it an achievement of analog-era editing but "also a stunningly prescient sonic prediction of the coming 'noise' of the Information Age, where the austere, professorial voice of authority must contend with a constant barrage of old and new media intruding." In a piece for NPR, Wang writes how the album is often considered to be the first mixtape, and considers Simon and Agel's work on the LP to be examples of "proto-mashup styles". (Note: Mikey IQ Jones of Fact considers The Medium Is the Massage to be an "American ancestor" to the British record label Ghost Box.)

== Track listing ==
All tracks written by Marshall McLuhan, Quentin Fiore and Jerome Agel.

=== Side one ===
1. "The Medium Is The Massage: With Marshall McLuhan" – 19:21

=== Side two ===
2. "The Medium Is the Massage: With Marshall McLuhan" – 23:15

== Personnel ==
Adapted from the liner notes of The Medium Is the Massage

- Marshall McLuhan – script, voice actor
- Quentin Fiore – script, voice actor
- Jerome Agel – executive director, script, voice actor
- John Simon – producer, music, director, voice actor
- Ralph Curtiss – effects
- Walt Gustafson – effects
- Ann Lynn – voice actor
- Bob McFadden– voice actor
- Bryna Raeburn – voice actor
- Elisabeth Lohman – voice actor
- John Culkin, S.J. – voice actor
- Sugar Wagner – voice actor
