= Marshall McLuhan bibliography =

Author bibliography

This is a bibliography of Marshall McLuhan's works.

== Published works ==
- 1942. The Place of Thomas Nashe in the Learning of His Time (doctoral dissertation); published as The Classical Trivium, 2006 below.
- 1951. The Mechanical Bride: Folklore of Industrial Man; 1st Ed.: The Vanguard Press, NY; reissued by Gingko Press, 2002 ISBN 1-58423-050-9.
- 1954. Counterblast; self-published 'zine', Toronto; reissued by Gingko Press, 2011.
- 1960 Report on Project in Understanding New Media National Association of Educational Broadcasters. U.S. Dept. of Health, Education and Welfare.
- 1960. Explorations in Communication, edited with Edmund S. Carpenter. Boston: Beacon Press.
- 1962. The Gutenberg Galaxy: The Making of Typographic Man; 1st Ed.: University of Toronto Press; reissued by Routledge & Kegan Paul ISBN 0-7100-1818-5.
- 1964. Understanding Media: The Extensions of Man; 1st Ed. McGraw Hill, NY; reissued by Gingko Press, 2003 ISBN 1-58423-073-8.
- 1967. The Medium Is the Massage: An Inventory of Effects with Quentin Fiore, produced by Jerome Agel; 1st Ed.: Random House; reissued by Gingko Press, 2001 ISBN 1-58423-070-3.
- 1967. Verbi-Voco-Visual Explorations; Something Else Press, NY.
- 1968. War and Peace in the Global Village, design/layout by Quentin Fiore, produced by Jerome Agel; 1st Ed.: Bantam, NY; reissued by Gingko Press, 2001 ISBN 1-58423-074-6.
- 1968. Through the Vanishing Point: Space in Poetry and Painting with Harley Parker; 1st Ed.: Harper & Row, NY.
- 1969. Counterblast, design/layout by Harley Parker; McClelland and Steward, Toronto.
- 1969. The Interior Landscape: The Literary Criticism of Marshall McLuhan 1943–1962 selected, compiled and edited by Eugene McNamara; McGraw-Hill, NY.
- 1970. Culture Is Our Business; McGraw Hill/Ballantine, NY.
- 1970. From Cliché to Archetype with Wilfred Watson; Viking, NY.
- 1972. Take Today: The Executive as Dropout with Barrington Nevitt; Harcourt Brace Jovanovich, NY.
- 1976. The Violence of the Media, The Canadian Forum
- 1976. Inside on the Outside, or the Spaced-Out American, Journal of Communication
- 1976. Seminar on Myth and Media, University of Toronto
- 1976. Misunderstanding the Media's Laws, Technology and Culture
- 1977. City as Classroom: Understanding Language and Media with Kathryn Hutchon and Eric McLuhan; Book Society of Canada, Agincourt, Ontario.
- 1977. Laws of the Media, with Preface by Paul Levinson, et cetera, June.
- 1988. Laws of Media: The New Science, with Eric McLuhan. University of Toronto Press, 1992.
- 1989. The Global Village: Transformations in World Life and Media in the 21st Century with Bruce R. Powers; Oxford University Press ISBN 0-19-505444-X.
- 2003. The Medium and the Light: Reflections on Religion, edited by Eric McLuhan and Jacek Szlarek; Ginkgo Press.
- 2004. Understanding Me: Lectures and Interviews edited by Stephanie McLuhan and David Staines; The MIT Press ISBN 0-262-13442-X.
- 2006. The Classical Trivium: The Place of Thomas Nashe in the Learning of His Time (first publication of McLuhan's 1942 doctoral dissertation); Gingko Press ISBN 1-58423-067-3.
- 2011. Media and Formal Cause with Eric McLuhan; NeoPoiesis Press, LCC ISBN 0-9832747-0-3.

== Articles ==
- 1944. "The Analogical Mirrors". The Kenyon Review 6(3):322–32.
  - 1989 (reprint). "The Analogical Mirrors." The Kenyon Review, New Series 11(1):208–15.
- 1944. "Edgar Poe's Tradition." The Sewanee Review 52(1):24–33.
- 1945. "The New York Wits." The Kenyon Review 7(1):12–28.
- 1945. "Another Aesthetic Peep-Show." The Sewanee Review 53(4):674–77.
- 1946. "An Ancient Quarrel in Modern America." The Classical Journal 41(4):156–62.
- 1946. "Footprints in the Sands of Crime." The Sewanee Review 54(4):617–34.
- 1947. "'Mr. Connolly and Mr. Hook' reviewed by Herbert Marshall McLuhan." The Sewanee Review 55(1):167–72.
- 1947. "The Southern Quality." The Sewanee Review 55(3):357–83.
- 1947. "Inside Blake and Hollywood." The Sewanee Review 55(4):710–15
- 1954. "Joyce, Mallarme, and the Press." The Sewanee Review 62(1):38–55.
- 1956. "The New Languages," with Edmund Carpenter. Chicago Review 10(1):46–52.
- 1958. "Speed of Cultural Change." College Composition and Communication 9(1):16–20.
- 1959. "Myth and Mass Media". Daedalus 88(2) Myth and Mythmaking:339–48.
- 1960. "Effects of the Improvements of Communication Media." The Journal of Economic History 20(4):566–75.
- 1961. "Roles, Masks, and Performances." New Literary History 2(3) Performances in Drama, the Arts, and Society:517–31
- 1967. "The Invisible Environment: The Future of an Erosion." Perspecta 11:163–67.
- 1973. "The Argument: Causality in the Electric World," with Barrington Nevitt. Technology and Culture 14(1):1–18.
- 1975. "Communication: McLuhan's Laws of the Media." Technology and Culture 16(1):74–78.
- 1978. "Multi-Media: The Laws of the Media," with Kathryn Hutchon and Eric McLuhan. English Journal 67(8):92–94.
- 1979. "Pound, Eliot, and the Rhetoric of The Waste Land." New Literary History 10(3) Anniversary Issue I:557–80.
- 2015. "The Future of the Library, circa 1976," with Robert K. Logan. Island 140:18–28.

== Published interviews ==
1. "Understanding Canada and Sundry Other Matters: Marshall McLuhan." Mademoiselle, January 1967, pp. 114–15, 126–30.
2. "Playboy Interview: Marshall McLuhan." Playboy, March 1969, pp. 26–27, 45, 55–56, 61, 63.
3. "The Table Talk of Marshall McLuhan." by Peter C. Newman. Maclean's, June 1971, pp. 42, 45.
4. "An Interview With Marshall McLuhan: His Outrageous Views About Women." by Linda Sandler. Miss Chatelaine, September 3, 1974, pp. 58–59, 82–87, 90–91.
5. "It Will Probably End the Motor Car: An Interview With Marshall McLuhan." by Kirwan Cox and S. M. Crean. Cinema Canada, August 1976, pp. 26–29.
6. "Interview With Professor Marshall McLuhan." Maclean's, March 7, 1977.

== Works about McLuhan ==
- 1997. Benedetti, Paul and Nancy DeHart. Forward Through the Rearview Mirror: Reflections on and by Marshall McLuhan. Boston: MIT Press.
- Carpenter, Edmund. 2001. "That Not-So-Silent Sea" [Appendix B]." Pp. 236–261 in The Virtual Marshall McLuhan, edited by D. F. Theall. McGill-Queen's University Press. (For the complete essay before it was edited for publication, see the external link below.)
- Coupland, Douglas. 2009. Extraordinary Canadians: Marshall McLuhan. Penguin Canada;
  - US edition: Marshall McLuhan: You Know Nothing of my Work!. Atlas & Company, 2011.
- Daniel, Jeff. 10 August 1997. "McLuhan's Two Messengers: Maurice McNamee and Walter Ong: world-class interpreters of his ideas." St. Louis Post-Dispatch. p. 4C.
- Federman, Mark. 2003. McLuhan for Managers: New Tools for New Thinking. Viking Canada.
- Finkelstein, Sidney. 1968. Sense and Nonsense of McLuhan New York: International Publishers.
- Flahiff, F. T. 2005. Always Someone to Kill the Doves: A Life of Sheila Watson. Edmonton: NeWest Press.
- Gordon, W. Terrence. 1997. Marshall McLuhan: Escape into Understanding: A Biography. Basic Books. ISBN 0465005497.
- Levinson, Paul. 1999 Digital McLuhan: A Guide to the Information Millennium. Routledge. ISBN 0-415-19251-X. (Book has been translated into Japanese, Chinese, Croatian, Romanian, Korean, Macedonian.)
- Marchand, Philip. 1989. Marshall McLuhan: The Medium and the Messenger. Random House.
  - Toronto: Vintage Canada; and Cambridge: MIT Press (revised ed.), 1998, with a new foreword by Neil Postman. ISBN 0262631865.
- McMahon, David, dir. 2002. McLuhan's Wake. National Film Board of Canada.
- Molinaro, Matie, Corinne McLuhan, and William Toye, eds. 1987. Letters of Marshall McLuhan. Toronto: Oxford University Press. ISBN 0195405943.
- Neill, Sam. 1971. "Books and Marshall McLuhan." Library Quarterly: Information, Community, Policy, vol. 41, no. 4, pp. 311-319. JSTOR 4306112.
- Ong, Walter J. 1981. "McLuhan as Teacher: The Future Is a Thing of the Past." Journal of Communication 31:129–35.
  - Pp. 11–18 in Ong's Faith and Contexts: Volume One. Scholars Press. 1992.
- —— 1970. "Review of McLuhan's 'The Interior Landscape: The Literary Criticism of Marshall McLuhan 1943–1962'." Criticism 12:244–51.
  - Pp. 69–77 in An Ong Reader: Challenges for Further Inquiry. Hampton Press. 2002.
- Theall, Donald F. 2001. The Virtual Marshall McLuhan. McGill-Queen's University Press.
- The Johns Hopkins Guide to Literary Theory and Criticism (1st ed.). 1994:481–83; (2nd ed.) 2005:643–45.
- Encyclopedia of Contemporary Literary Theory: Approaches, Scholars, Terms. University of Toronto Press. 1993. pp. 421–23.
- Encyclopedia of Literary Critics and Criticism. Fitzroy Dearborn. 1999. pp. 744–47.
