= 2031 in public domain =

When a work's copyright expires, it enters the public domain. Since laws vary globally, the copyright status of some works are not uniform. The following is a list of creators whose works enter the public domain in 2031 under the most common copyright regimes, assuming no further extensions to copyright terms become law in the interim.

== Countries with life + 70 years ==
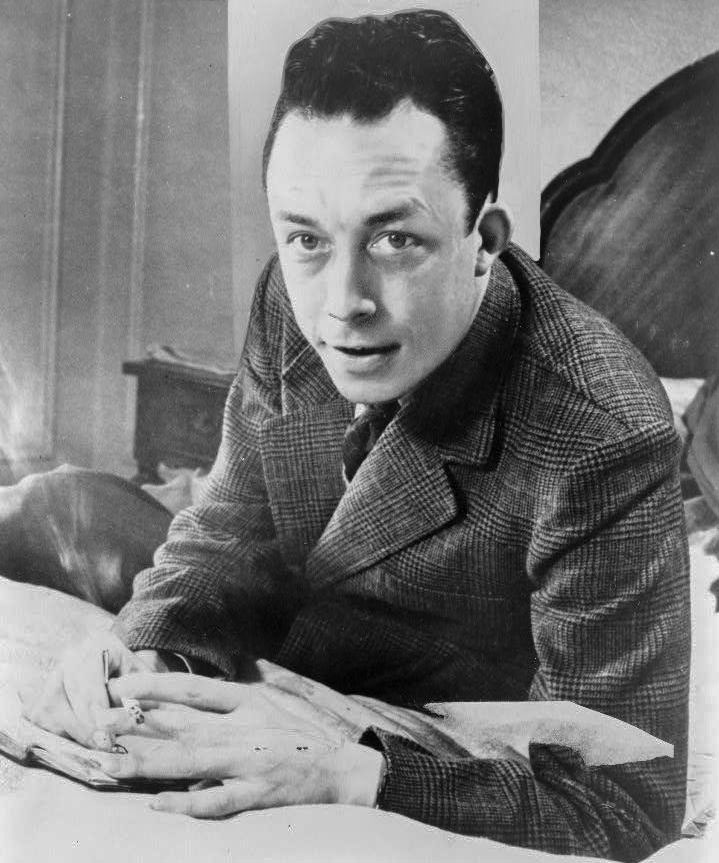
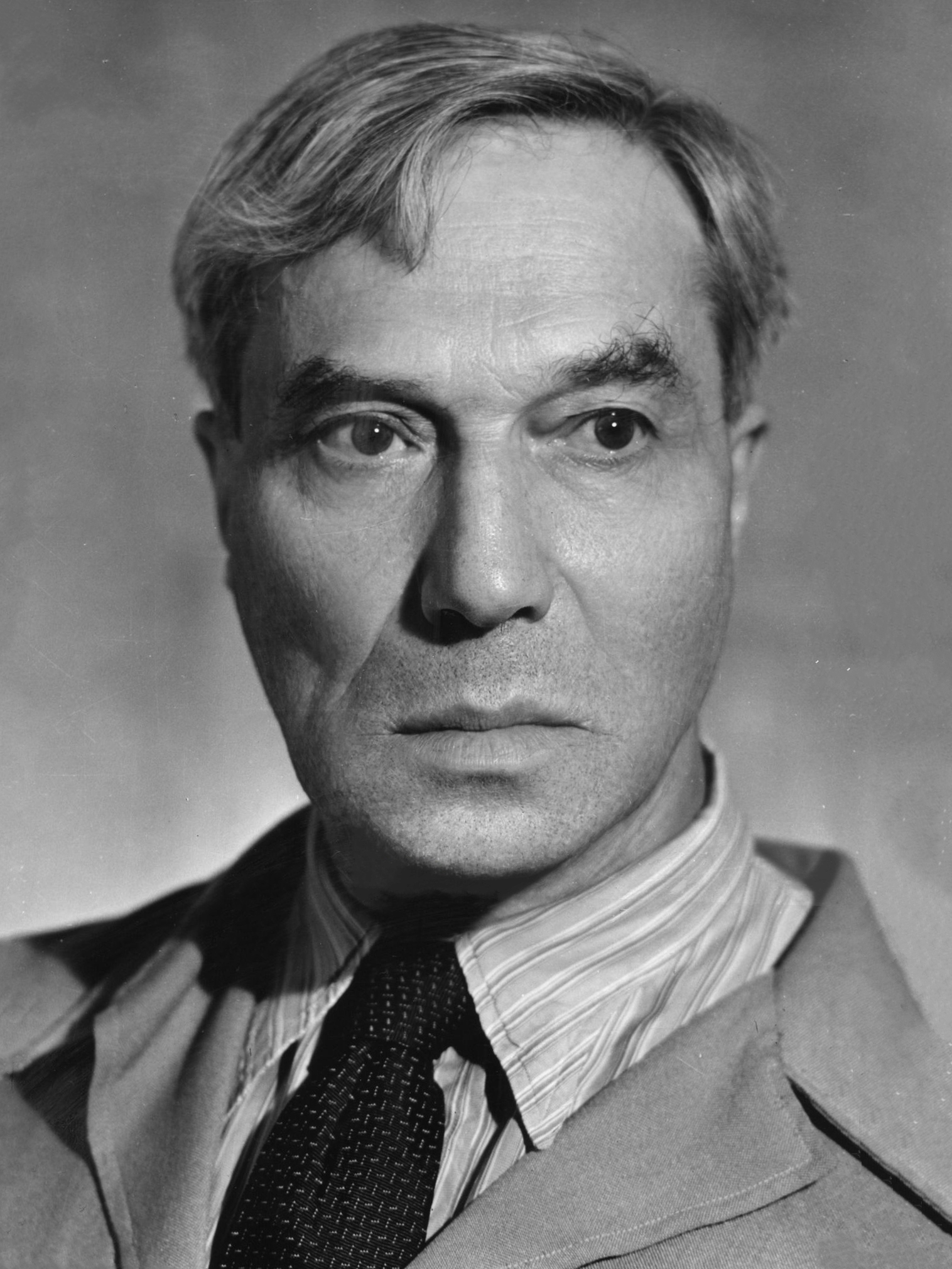
The literature of Albert Camus (left) and Boris Pasternak (right) will enter the public domain in Europe in 2031. However, since Pasternak was posthumously rehabilitated by the Soviet authorities in 1987, there is a possibility that the copyright will still remain in his native Russia until 2058.

Except for Belarus (Life + 50 years) and Spain (which has a copyright term of Life + 80 years for creators that died before 1988), a work enters the public domain in Europe 70 years after the creator's death, if it was published during the creator's lifetime. In addition, several other countries have a limit of 70 years. The list is sorted alphabetically and includes a notable work of the creator.

Names	Country	Death	Occupation	Notable work
Chris van Abkoude	Netherlands	2 January 1960	Writer, Novelist	Pietje Bell
Vai. Mu. Kothainayaki Ammal	India	20 February 1960	Novelist	
Lady Cynthia Asquith	United Kingdom	31 March 1960	Author and editor	This Mortal Coil
Rajshekhar Basu	India	27 April 1960	Chemist	
Eric Temple Bell	United Kingdom; United States	21 December 1960	Mathematician and science fiction writer	
Albert Camus	France	4 January 1960	Philosopher, author	The Stranger
A. Chakravarti	India	10 February 1960	Professor	
Indira Devi Chaudhurani	India	12 August 1960	Musician	
Sudhindranath Dutta	India	25 June 1960	Poet, journalist	
Victor Rousseau Emanuel	United Kingdom	28 January 1960	Author	
John Russell Fearn	United Kingdom	18 September 1960	Author	
Zora Neale Hurston	United States	18 September 1960	Author	Their Eyes Were Watching God
M. Raghava Iyengar	India	1960	Literary scholar	
Albert Kesselring	Germany	16 July 1960	General	Soldat bis zum letzten Tag
Jigar Moradabadi	India	9 September 1960	Poet	Yeh Hai Maikada
Bal Krishna Sharma Naveen	India	29 April 1960	Poet, journalist, activist	
Elsie J. Oxenham	United Kingdom	9 January 1960	Children's novelist	Abbey Series of books
Boris Pasternak	Russia	30 May 1960	Poet, author	Doctor Zhivago
Eden Phillpotts	United Kingdom	29 December 1960	Author, poet and dramatist	The Farmer's Wife
Kesari Balakrishna Pillai	India	18 December 1960	Literary critic, journalist	Kesari
Nathuram Premi	India	30 January 1960	Poet, publisher	
Navaratna Rama Rao	India	1960	Political leader, scholar	
Sushila Samad	India	10 December 1960	Poet, journalist	
Sripada Krishnamurty Sastry	India	29 December 1960	Poet	Mahamahopadhyaya
Kshitimohan Sen	India	12 March 1960	Professor	
Acharya Chatursen Shastri	India	2 February 1960	Writer	Dharamputra
Krishnalal Shridharani	India	23 July 1960	Poet, playwright	
Nevil Shute	United Kingdom	12 January 1960	Aeronautical engineer, novelist	On the Beach
Victor Sjöström	Sweden	3 January 1960	Film director, actor	The Phantom Carriage
C. J. Thomas	India	14 July 1960	Playwright, academic, artist	
Dadasaheb Torne	India	19 January 1960	Film director	Shree Pundalik
Ethel Voynich	Ireland	27 July 1960	Novelist	The Gadfly

== Countries with life + 60 years ==
In Bangladesh, India, and Venezuela a work enters the public domain 60 years after the creator's death.

Names	Country	Death	Occupation	Notable work
Abdul Hosein Amini	Iran	3 July 1970	Theologian	Al-Ghadir
Rita Angus	New Zealand	25 January 1970	Painter	Cass
Shmuel Yosef Agnon	Israel	17 February 1970	Writer	The Bridal Canopy
Fernando Arbello	Puerto Rico	26 July 1970	Musician	
Otto Baecker	Germany	22 May 1970	Cinematographer	Gold
Archibald Baxter	New Zealand	10 August 1970	Socialist, pacifist	We Will Not Cease
William Beaudine	United States	18 March 1970	Film director, actor	Boys Will Be Boys
George Blair	United States	19 April 1970	Film Director	
R. V. C. Bodley	United Kingdom	26 May 1970	Army officer, author	Algeria From Within
Louise Bogan	United States	4 February 1970	Poet	Body of This Death
Vera Brittain	United Kingdom	29 March 1970	Writer	Testament of Youth
William J. Brown	United States	4 February 1970	Architect	
Mohamed Fadhel Ben Achour	Tunisia	20 April 1970	Theologian	Works
Dulce Carman	New Zealand	1970	Author	Neath the Maori Moon
Rudolf Carnap	Germany	14 September 1970	Philosopher	Der Logische Aufbau der Welt
Choe Hyeon-bae	South Korea	23 March 1970	Educationalist	Selected publications
Émile Coderre	Canada	6 April 1970	Poet	Works
Charles Cotton	New Zealand	29 June 1970	Geologist	Geomorphology of New Zealand
Mohamed Abdelaziz Djaït	Tunisia	5 January 1970	Theologian	Works
William Dobell	Australia	13 May 1970	Artist	Mr Joshua Smith
Guy Endore	United States	12 February 1970	Author, screenwriter	The Werewolf of Paris
E. M. Forster	United Kingdom	7 June 1970	Writer	Works
Babbis Friis-Baastad	Norway	10 January 1970	Children's writer	Ikke ta Bamse
Erle Stanley Gardner	United States	11 March 1970	Author, lawyer	Perry Mason series of books
Maurice Gemayel	Lebanon	31 October 1970	Politician	Tripoli and Decentralization
L. Wolfe Gilbert	United States	12 July 1970	Songwriter	Down Yonder
Rube Goldberg	United States	7 December 1970	Cartoonist, News reporter, Sculptor, Engineer	
John Gunther	United States	29 May 1970	Author	Death Be Not Proud
Muhsin al-Hakim	Iraq	1970	Theologian	Minhaj as-Saleheen
Alice Hamilton	United States	22 September 1970	Physician, research scientist	Industrial Poisons in the United States
Lawren Harris	Canada	29 January 1970	Painter	
Marlen Haushofer	Austria	21 March 1970	Writer	
Erich Heckel	Germany	27 January 1970	Artist	Roquairol
Jimi Hendrix	United States	18 September 1970	Musician, singer-songwriter	"Purple Haze"
Roman Ingarden	Poland	14 June 1970	Philosopher	The Literary Work of Art
Michał Kalecki	Poland	18 April 1970	Economist	Próba teorii koniunktury
William Archibald Mackintosh	Canada	29 December 1970	Economist	Economic Problems Of The Prairie Provinces
Leopoldo Marechal	Argentina	26 June 1970	Writer	Adam Buenosayres
François Mauriac	France	1 September 1970	Writer	Thérèse Desqueyroux
Bruce McLaren	New Zealand	2 June 1970	Racing car driver	Bruce McLaren: From the Cockpit
Yukio Mishima	Japan	25 November 1970	Novelist, playwright, poet, writer, essayist, critic	Works
Gamal Abdel Nasser	Egypt	28 September 1970	Politician	Philosophy of Revolution
Charles Olson	United States	10 January 1970	Poet	Works
John Dos Passos	United States	28 September 1970	Novelist	U.S.A. trilogy
Waldo Peirce	United States	8 March 1970	Painter	Legends of the Hudson
Vladimir Propp	Russia	22 August 1970	Folklorist	Morphology of the Tale
Alf Prøysen	Norway	23 November 1970	Musician, Writer, Composer	Works
Erich Maria Remarque	Germany	25 September 1970	Novelist	All Quiet on the Western Front
Ali Riahi	Tunisia	27 March 1970	Musician	
Gonzalo Roig	Cuba	13 June 1970	Composer	Cecilia Valdés
Mark Rothko	United States	25 February 1970	Abstract painter	Black on Maroon
Bertrand Russell	United Kingdom	2 February 1970	Philosopher, mathematician	Principia Mathematica
Nelly Sachs	German Empire; Sweden	12 May 1970	Poet, Writer	Works
Ruth Sawyer	United States	3 June 1970	Writer	Roller Skates
Slim Harpo	United States	31 January 1970	Blues Musician	I'm a King Bee
William Stewart Wallace	Canada	11 March 1970	Historian	Encyclopedia of Canada
Hassan Taqizadeh	Iran	28 January 1970	Politician	Old Iranian Calendars
Sophie Treadwell	United States	20 February 1970	Playwright	Machinal
Jacob Viner	Canada	12 September 1970	Economist	Works
Otto Heinrich Warburg	Germany	1 August 1970	Physiologist	The Metabolism of Tumours
Leonard Wild	New Zealand	23 July 1970	Agricultural scientist, writer	An Experiment in Self-government, Soils and Manures in New Zealand
Harry M. Woods	United States	14 January 1970	Songwriter	When the Red, Red Robin (Comes Bob, Bob, Bobbin' Along)
Abraham Zapruder	United States	30 August 1970	Clothing manufacturer	Zapruder film
Mahmoud Zulfikar	Egypt	22 May 1970	Director	Filmography

== Countries with life + 50 years ==
In most countries of Africa and Asia, as well as Belarus, Bolivia, New Zealand, Egypt and Uruguay, a work enters the public domain 50 years after the creator's death.

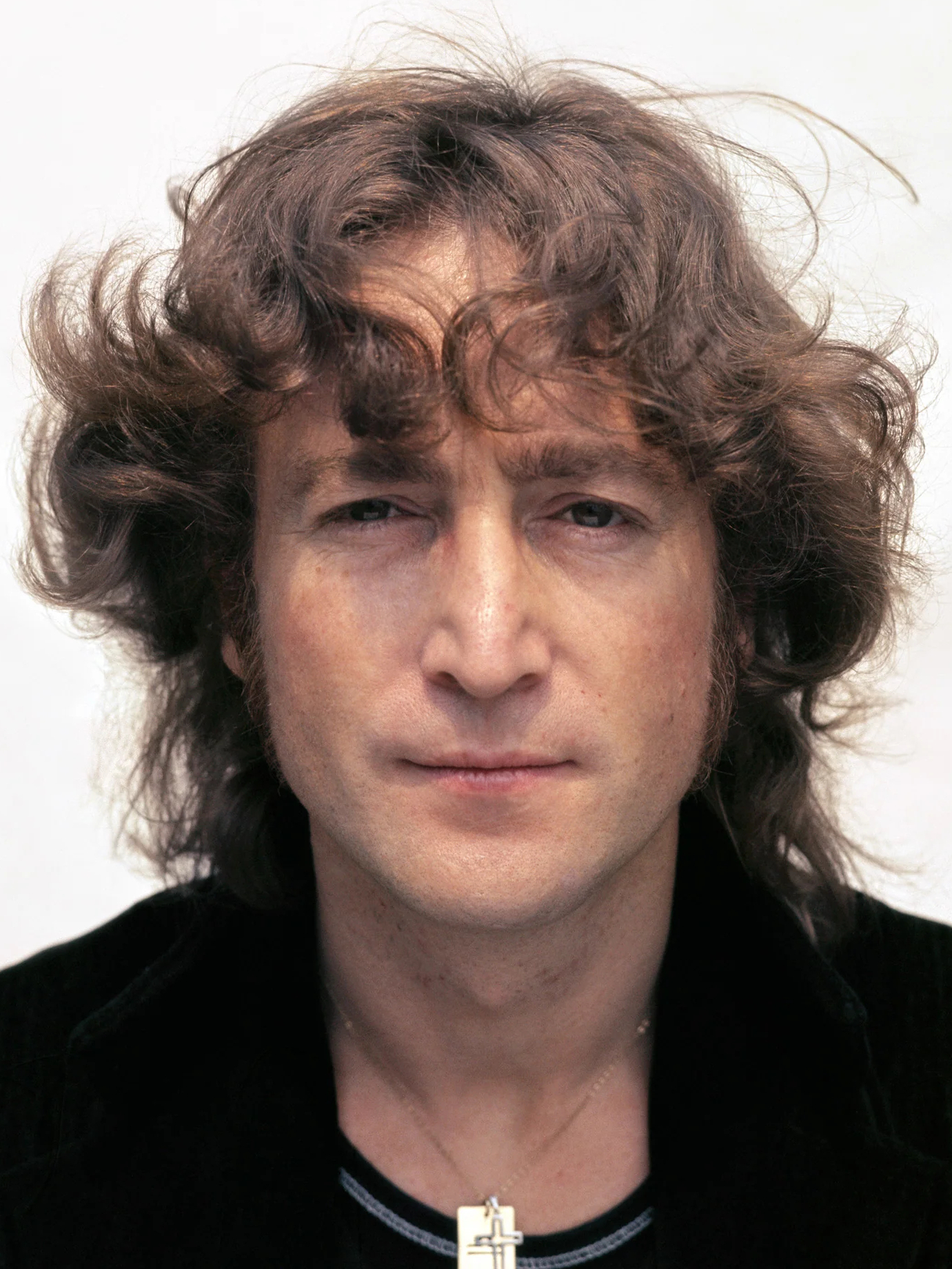
All of John Lennon's songs that he produced as a solo musician will enter the public domain in most of Africa and Asia in 2031.

Names	Country	Death	Occupation	Notable work
Joy Adamson	Kenya	3 January 1980	Conservationist, writer	Born Free
Todhunter Ballard	United States	27 December 1980	Genre novelist	
Roland Barthes	France	25 March 1980	Literary theorist	Mythologies, "The Death of the Author"
Patrick Campbell, 3rd Baron Glenavy	Ireland	9 November 1980	Journalist, humorist	
Alejo Carpentier	Cuba	24 April 1980	Novelist, writer	The Kingdom of this World
Amy Clarke	United Kingdom	20 June 1980	Mystical poet	
Margaret Cole	United Kingdom	7 May 1980	Political writer, biographer, activist	
John Collier	United Kingdom	6 April 1980	Short story writer	
Marc Connelly	United States	21 December 1980	Playwright	
Sam Cree	Northern Ireland	26 October 1980	Playwright	
Gareth Evans	United Kingdom	10 August 1980	Philosopher	
George Sutherland Fraser	Scotland	3 January 1980	Poet, critic	
Romain Gary	France	2 December 1980	Novelist	Les Racines du ciel, La Vie devant soi
Jacky Gillott	United Kingdom	19 September 1980	Novelist	
Salvator Gotta	Italy	7 June 1980	Writer	
Traian Herseni	Romania	17 July 1980	Social scientist, journalist	
Alfred Hitchcock	United Kingdom; United States	29 April 1980	Film director	Filmography
P. M. Hubbard	United Kingdom	17 March 1980	Crime writer	
Idris Jamma'	Sudan	27 March 1980	Poet	
John Lennon	United Kingdom	8 December 1980	Musician, songwriter, author	Discography
Olivia Manning	United Kingdom	23 July 1980	Novelist, poet	Fortunes of War
Marshall McLuhan	Canada	31 December 1980	Philosopher	Works
Carey McWilliams	United States	27 June 1980	Author, editor, lawyer	
David Mercer	United Kingdom	8 August 1980	Dramatist	
Henry Miller	United States	7 June 1980	Novelist	Works
Vinicius de Moraes	Brazil	9 July 1980	Poet, songwriter	
Katherine Anne Porter	United States	18 September 1980	Novelist, essayist	
Marin Preda	Romania	16 May 1980	Novelist	Moromeții, Cel mai iubit dintre pământeni
Caradog Prichard	Wales	25 February 1980	Poet, novelist	Un Nos Ola Leuad
Barbara Pym	United Kingdom	11 January 1980	Novelist	
Irene Rathbone	United Kingdom	21 January 1980	Novelist	
Mart Raud	Estonia	6 July 1980	Poet, playwright, writer	
Nelson Rodrigues	Brazil	21 December 1980	Playwright, journalist, novelist	
Jean-Paul Sartre	France	15 April 1980	Philosopher, novelist, dramatist	
Nichita Smochină	Transnistria	14 December 1980	Ethnographer, journalist	
C. P. Snow	United Kingdom	1 July 1980	Novelist, scientist	Strangers and Brothers, The Two Cultures
Eugeniu Ștefănescu-Est	Romania	12 March 1980	Poet, novelist, cartoonist	
Ben Travers	United Kingdom	18 December 1980	Playwright, screenwriter, novelist	
Kenneth Tynan	United Kingdom	26 July 1980	Theater critic	
Marie Under	Estonia	25 September 1980	Poet	
James Wright	United States	25 March 1980	Poet	The Branch Will Not Break

== Countries with life + 80 years ==
Spain has a copyright term of life + 80 years for creators that died before 1988. In Colombia and Equatorial Guinea, a work enters the public domain 80 years after the creator's death.

Names	Country	Death	Occupation	Notable work
Henry H. Arnold	United States	15 January 1950	General	Published works
Octave-Louis Aubert	France	14 January 1950	Writer, journalist	Le Livre de la Bretagne
Irving Bacheller	United States	24 February 1950	Writer, journalist	Eben Holden
Sergei Bakhrushin	Russia	8 March 1950	Historian	
Miklós Bánffy	Hungary	5 June 1950	Nobleman, politician, writer	A Transylvanian Tale
Pavel Bazhov	Russia	3 December 1950	Writer	The Malachite Box
Max Beckmann	Germany	27 December 1950	Painter, draftsman, printmaker, sculptor	
William Rose Benét	United States	4 May 1950	Writer, poet, editor	Saturday Review of Literature, The Reader's Encyclopedia
Lev Berg	Russia	24 December 1950	Geographer, biologist and ichthyologist	
Ben Black	United States	26 December 1950	Composer, lyricist	"Moonlight and Roses"
Léon Blum	France	30 March 1950	Politician	Les Problèmes de la Paix
Ambrogio Bollati	Italy	26 March 1950	General, Historian	Works
D. K. Broster	United Kingdom	7 February 1950	Novelist	The Flight of the Heron
Herbert Ashwin Budd	United Kingdom	1950	Painter	
Joe Burke	United States	9 June 1950	Songwriter, Composer, pianist	"Dancing With Tears in My Eyes", "Painting the Clouds With Sunshine", "Rambling Rose", "Tip-Toe Through the Tulips"
Edgar Rice Burroughs	United States	19 March 1950	Author of adventure and science fiction	Tarzan and Barsoom
J. Carlos	Brazil	2 October 1950	Cartoonist, illustrator, graphic designer, sculptor	
Basilio Cascella	Italy	24 July 1950	Artist	Il bagno della pastora
Alfonso Daniel Rodríguez Castelao	Spain	7 January 1950	Painter	
Neville William Cayley	Australia	17 March 1950	Ornithologist & artist	"What Bird is That?", 1931
Francesco Cilea	Italy	20 November 1950	Composer	L'arlesiana and Adriana Lecouvreur
Leôncio Correia (pt)	Brazil	19 June 1950	Lawyer, politician, writer and journalist	
Erle Cox	Australia	20 November 1950	Journalist and science fiction writer	Out of the Silence
Walter Damrosch	United States	22 December 1950	Composer	
Frank Parker Day	Canada	30 July 1950	Author and academic	
Warwick Deeping	United Kingdom	20 April 1950	Author	Sorrell and Son
Buddy DeSylva	United States	11 July 1950	Songwriter	Avalon, Look For the Silver Lining, Somebody Loves Me
Edward d'Evry	United Kingdom	25 December 1950	Composer	
Lancelot de Mole	Australia	6 May 1950	Engineer & inventor	Tracked armoured vehicle, 1911
Clément Doucet	Belgium	15 October 1950	Composer, pianist	
Anatoly Drozdov (ru)	Russia	10 September 1950	Composer, pianist	
Theodor Duesterberg	Germany	4 November 1950	Politician	The Steel Helmet and Hitler
Walter Eucken	Germany	20 March 1950	Economist	Works
Percy Keese Fitzhugh	United States	5 July 1950	Author of children and young adult literature	
Yevgeny Gunst	Russia	30 January 1950	Composer	
John Gould Fletcher	United States	10 May 1950	Poet	Selected Poems
Ernest Haycox	United States	13 October 1950	Author of Western fiction	
John Rippiner Heath	United Kingdom	23 December 1950	Doctor, musician, composer	Three Macedonian Sketches
William Hovgaard	Denmark; United States	5 January 1950	Professor, Writer	Submarine Boats, The Voyages Of The Norsemen To America
Heydar Huseynov	Azerbaijan	15 August 1950	Philosopher	Dialectical Materialism
Rex Ingram	United States	2 July 1950	Film director, producer, writer and actor	The Four Horsemen of the Apocalypse, The Prisoner of Zenda
George Cecil Ives	United Kingdom	4 June 1950	Writer, penal reformer	English Prisons Today
Émile Jaques-Dalcroze	Switzerland	1 July 1950	Composer, music educator	
Johannes V. Jensen	Denmark	25 November 1950	Author	The Long Journey
Charles L. Johnson	United States	28 December 1950	Composer	
Al Jolson	United States	23 October 1950	Songwriter	
Eddie Kilfeather	United States	13 January 1950	Composer	
Alfred Korzybski	Russian Empire; United States	1 March 1950	Engineer and founder of Institute of General Semantics	Science and Sanity: An Introduction to Non-Aristotelian Systems and General Semantics
Sigizmund Krzhizhanovsky	Russia	28 December 1950	Writer	
Harold Laski	United Kingdom	24 March 1950	Political theorist, economist	A Grammar of Politics
Harry Lauder	United Kingdom	26 February 1950	Comedian, Singer/songwriter	Roamin' in the Gloamin'
Lilian Sophia Locke	Australia	1 July 1950	Suffragette & Trade-unionist	Secretary of the United Council for Woman's Suffrage, 1890s
Heinrich Mann	Germany	11 March 1950	Writer	Professor Unrat
Edgar Lee Masters	United States	5 March 1950	Writer	Spoon River Anthology
F. O. Matthiessen	United States	1 April 1950	literary critic	American Renaissance: Art and Expression in the Age of Emerson and Whitman
Marcel Mauss	France	10 February 1950	Sociologist	The Gift
Ernest John Moeran	United Kingdom	1 December 1950	Composer	
Alfred Edward Moffat	United Kingdom	6 June 1950	Composer, collector of music	Meister-Schule der alten Zeit
Edna St Vincent Millay	United States	19 October 1950	Poet, playwright	Renascence
Ali Moustafa Mosharafa	Egypt	16 January 1950	Theoretical physicist	
Lewis Muir	United States	19 January 1950	Songwriter	Ragtime Cowboy Joe
Pavel Muratov	Russia	5 February 1950	Writer, art historian	Images of Italy
Nikolai Myaskovsky	Russia	8 August 1950	Composer	Symphony No. 6 (Myaskovsky)
Vaslav Nijinsky	Russia	8 April 1950	Ballet dancer and choreographer	Diary
George Orwell	United Kingdom	21 January 1950	Journalist and author	Animal Farm, Nineteen Eighty-Four, and other works
Cesare Pavese	Italy	27 August 1950	Writer, translator	The Moon and the Bonfires
Max Pemberton	United Kingdom	22 February 1950	Novelist of adventure and mystery literature	
Octávio Pinto	Brazil	31 October 1944	Composer, architect	
Ernest Poole	United States	10 January 1950	Writer	His Family
Gustaf John Ramstedt	Russian Empire; Finland	25 November 1950	Explorer, linguist, diplomat	Seitsemän retkeä itään
R. R. Ryan	United Kingdom	18 October 1950	Author	
Eliel Saarinen	Russian Empire; Finland; United States	1 July 1950	Architect	Works
Rafael Sabatini	Italy; United Kingdom	13 February 1950	Writer	The Sea Hawk, Scaramouche, The Odissey of Captain Blood, Bellarion the Fortunate
Theophrastos Sakellaridis	Greece	2 January 1950	Composer, conductor	Ο Βαφτιστικός
Guðjón Samúelsson	Iceland	25 April 1950	Architect	Hallgrímskirkja, National Theatre of Iceland, Akureyrarkirkja
Joseph Schumpeter	Austria	8 January 1950	Economist	Capitalism, Socialism and Democracy
Milton Schwarzwald	United States	2 March 1950	Director, composer	
George Bernard Shaw	United Kingdom; Ireland	2 November 1950	Writer	Man and Superman, Pygmalion, Saint Joan
Adaline Shepherd	United States	12 March 1950	Composer	
Forrest Shreve	United States	19 July 1950	Botanist	Works
Martinus Sieveking	Netherlands	26 November 1950	Composer, music teacher	
Jan Smuts	South Africa	11 September 1950	Statesman, military leader, and philosopher	Holism and Evolution
John M. Stahl	United States	12 January 1950	Film Director and Producer	Father Was a Fullback
Olaf Stapledon	United Kingdom	6 September 1950	Philosopher and science fiction author	Star Maker, Last and First Men and Odd John
Henry L. Stimson	United States	20 October 1950	Politician	Democracy And Nationalism In Europe
Tatiana Sukhotina-Tolstaya	Russia	21 September 1950	Painter and memoirist	
Attilio Teruzzi	Italy	26 April 1950	Politician	Cirenaica Verde
Trilussa	Italy	21 December 1950	Poet	Works
Orhan Veli Kanık	Turkey	14 November 1950	Poet	Garip, Collected Poems
Xavier Villaurrutia	Mexico	25 December 1950	Poet, Playwright	Works
Archibald P. Wavell	United Kingdom	24 May 1950	General	Generals And Generalship
Kurt Weill	Germany	3 April 1950	Composer	The Threepenny Opera
Yi Gwangsu	South Korea	25 October 1950	Writer, independence activist	Heartless

== United States ==
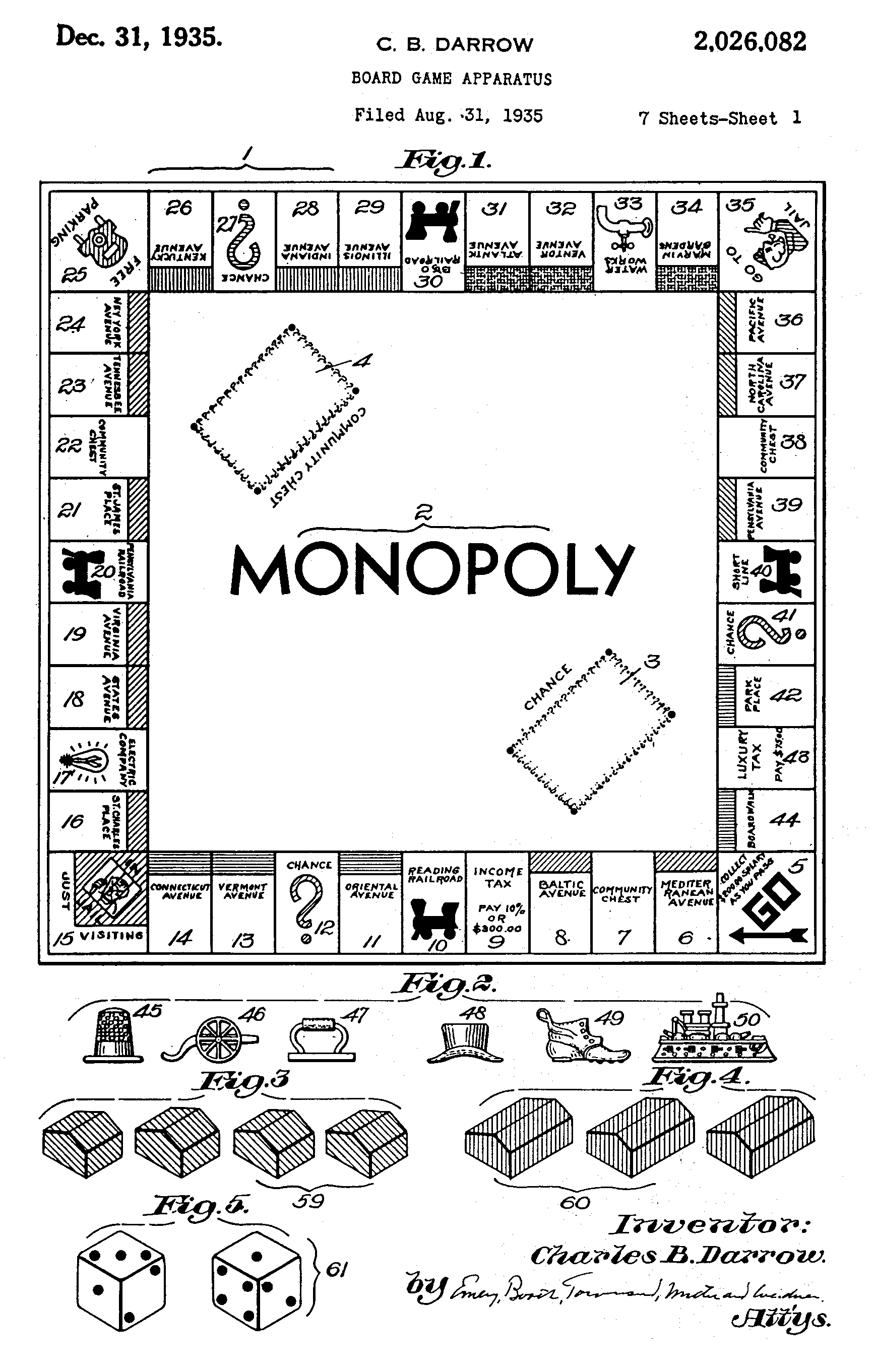
The first patent for the Parker Brothers version of Monopoly, which will enter the public domain in 2031.

Under the Copyright Term Extension Act, books published in 1935, films released in 1935, and other works published in 1935 will enter the public domain in 2031. Sound recordings published in 1930 and unpublished works whose authors died in 1960 will also enter the public domain.

Notable films that will enter the public domain in 2031 include Best Picture Academy Award winner Mutiny on the Bounty starring Clark Gable and Charles Laughton, Universal horror films Bride of Frankenstein and Werewolf of London, Alfred Hitchcock's The 39 Steps, John Ford's The Informer with Victor McLaglen, Busby Berkeley's Gold Diggers of 1935, Max Reinhardt's adaptation of A Midsummer Night's Dream with Olivia de Havilland and James Cagney, Captain Blood with Errol Flynn, George Cukor's adaptation of David Copperfield with Frank Lawton, The Lives of a Bengal Lancer with Gary Cooper, Top Hat starring Fred Astaire and Ginger Rogers, the Marx Brothers comedy A Night at the Opera, Naughty Marietta with the first pairing of Jeanette MacDonald and Nelson Eddy, The Little Colonel with Shirley Temple and Lionel Barrymore, Will Rogers' final films Steamboat Round the Bend and In Old Kentucky, Tumbling Tumbleweeds with Gene Autry in one of his first starring roles, Henry Fonda's film debut The Farmer Takes a Wife, Hop-Along Cassidy with William Boyd (the first film to star the title character), the musical film Metropolitan (20th Century Fox's first film under that name), Alberto Cavalcanti's Bristis coal mining documentary Coal Face, Boris Barnet's film By the Bluest of Seas, Leni Riefenstahl's Nazi propaganda film Triumph of the Will along with other Nazi films The Old and the Young King, Joan of Arc, The Private Life of Louis XIV, Frisians in Peril, and The Higher Command, the first color Mickey Mouse cartoon The Band Concert as well as the first teamings of Mickey with Donald Duck and Goofy, the Silly Symphony cartoons The Tortoise and the Hare and Three Orphan Kittens, and I Haven't Got a Hat with the debut of the oldest recurring Looney Tunes character, Porky Pig.

Important literary works entering the public domain include Agatha Christie's crime novels Death in the Clouds and Three Act Tragedy, John Steinbeck's novel Tortilla Flat, Mary Poppins Comes Back by P. L. Travers, Christopher Isherwood's novel Mr Norris Changes Trains, Dorothy L. Sayers' detective novel Gaudy Night introducing Lord Peter Wimsey, Georgette Heyer's novel Regency Buck, Sinclair Lewis' It Can't Happen Here, Rex Stout's The League of Frightened Men, Laura Ingalls Wilder's Little House on the Prairie, Ernest Hemingway's Green Hills of Africa, T. E. Lawrence's autobiography Seven Pillars of Wisdom, Hardy Boys novel The Hidden Harbor Mystery, Nancy Drew novel The Message in the Hollow Oak, Clifford Odets' plays Waiting for Lefty, Awake and Sing!, Till the Day I Die and Paradise Lost, T. S. Eliot's play Murder in the Cathedral, the first book of the children's character Mumfie created by British author Katharine Tozer, and Yasunari Kawabata's Snow Country in its original Japanese. The earliest appearances of American comic strip character Little Lulu and Argentine comic character Isidoro Cañones will also enter the public domain. Additionally, since Disney did not renew any of its comics published before 1935, comic strips from the company will begin entering the public domain this year.

Works of art entering the public domain include René Magritte's The Portrait and the second version of his Human Condition, Joan Miró's Metamorphosis, Pablo Picasso's Jeune Fille Endormie, and M. C. Escher's lithograph Hand with Reflecting Sphere. The first edition of the board game Monopoly will also enter the public domain.

Examples of notable musical works entering the public domain include the popular songs "Cheek to Cheek", "When I Grow Too Old to Dream", and "Red Sails in the Sunset"; Sergei Prokofiev's Violin Concerto No. 2; and George Gershwin's Porgy and Bess.

== See also ==
- List of American films of 1935
- 1935 in literature
- 1935 in music
- 1960 in literature and 1980 in literature for deaths of writers
- Public Domain Day
- Creative Commons
