= Robert The =

American artist

Robert The is a New York City artist known for his Gun Books and other sculptures made primarily of books.

== Career ==
The's work has been exhibited in notable museums in the US and internationally. According to the Chicago Reader, "The is reluctant to betray his trade secrets, saying only that he uses a power saw. Paper is harder to cut than wood', he says". Each year "he cranks out hundreds of pieces--every one is different". The's book guns have been collected, writes the Chicago Reader, in the Museum of Modern Art, the Museum of Contemporary Art in Los Angeles, and the Walker Art Center in Minneapolis.

== Reception ==
The New York Times, discussing the future of physical books, wrote that "creative uses for books that do not involve engaging with words on a page already abound", and instances The's books cut "into gun shapes".

According to the Chicago Reader, The "owns up to [the book guns'] sensational aspect", and says he "still gets complaints", the majority (in The's words) "from leftists".

GreenMuze writes that "Bookguns by American artist Robert The, are used books that are artfully cut into gun-like shapes. Each book is carefully selected to create a play-on-words or add an ironic dimension to his recycled artwork." Book titles include Salinger's Catcher in the Rye, McLuhan's The Medium is the Massage and the Bible.
