= Bryna Raeburn =

American actress

- Born: Bertha Sinai; March 14, 1915; Jersey City, New Jersey, U.S.
- Died: January 3, 1985 (aged 69); Jersey City, New Jersey, U.S.
- Occupation: Actress
- Years active: 1941–1980
- Spouse: Dr. Meyer Smith
- Children: 1

Bryna Raeburn (born Bertha Sinai; March 14, 1915 – January 3, 1985) was an American radio and voice actress, known for her versatility, in particular her command of a wide range of accents and dialects.

== Early life and career ==
Born and raised in Jersey City, New Jersey, Raeburn was the youngest of three children born to Russian-born Julius Sinai and Dora Hanna Blumenthal.

Although little is known of her formal education, she spoke many years later with Bergen Record entertainment writer Virginia Lambert.

I majored in drama in college and knew how to use movement and facial expression, but I never really wanted to do anything except radio acting. I'm in love with speech and language. [...] I love radio drama. I've never been a raving beauty, but radio lets me play glamorous ladies.

To which her interviewer immediately appended, "or Scottish crones, French maids, Spanish dancers, Italian opera singers, British royalty, or whatever else a scriptwriter may dream up." As Raeburn's colleague Mary Jane Higby later recalled, "Most of us could imitate some of our fellows, but some, like Art Carney, Bryna Raeburn and Billy Mack, could imitate anybody."

On radio, aside from recurring roles such as Mrs. Graham—opposite Bob Griffin—on Mutual's Dr. Graham and Family, she was a frequent guest performer on NBC's Dimension X and CBS Radio Mystery Theater. The latter, 1974's nearly decade-long revival of radio's "golden age," was especially gratifying for Raeburn, who recalled, "I was in the last episode of so many of the old radio shows, it was really depressing."

== Personal life and death ==
By 1950, Raeburn had married fellow Jersey City native Dr. Meyer Smith. They had one child, a daughter, born on New Year's Day, 1956.

On January 3, 1985, at age 69, Raeburn died of undisclosed causes in Jersey City. She was survived by her husband and daughter. Her remains are interred at Riverside Cemetery in Rochelle Park, New Jersey.

== Filmography ==
Year	Title	Role	Director	Other cast members	Notes	Refs.
1960	Some Place Like Home	Self	None credited	Billed between Sam Jaffe and Sam Gray, all doing narration.	13 minute, 40 second filmstrip produced in 1959, debuted May 10, 1960 at New York's Jewish Museum.	
1966	The Ballad of Smokey the Bear	Mama Bear	Larry Roemer	James Cagney, William Marine		
1967	The Wacky World of Mother Goose	Old Mother Hubbard	Jules Bass	Margaret Rutherford, Bob McFadden		
1974	The Mad Magazine TV Special	NA	Gordon Bellamy, Chris K. Ishii, Jimmy T. Murakami	Alan Swift, Patricia Bright, Gene Klavan		

== Discography ==
With Bob McFadden

- Fast, Fast, Fast Relief From TV Commercials (Audio Fidelity, 1963)
- Charting the Globe (Classroom Materials, 196-)
- Halloween (Classroom Materials, 196-)
- Introducing the Rhythm Instruments (Classroom Materials, 1967)

With Jacques Hirschler

- Let's Visit France And Italy (Vocalion, 1964)

With Bob Booker

- The New First Family, 1968 – A Futuristic Fairy Tale (Verve, 1966)
- Scream on Someone You Love Today (Verve, 1967)
- Senator Bobby's Christmas Party (Columbia, 1967);
  as Lady Bird Johnson, 2nd staff member, secretary
- Beware of Greeks Bearing Gifts (Musicor), 1968)

With Charlie Manna

- The Rise & Fall of the Great Society (Verve, 1966)

With Napoleon XIV

- They're Coming to Take Me Away, Ha-Haaa! (Warner Bros., 1966); featuring Raeburn, credited as Josephine XV, performing "I'm Happy They Took You Away, Ha-Haaa!"

With Marshall McLuhan

- The Medium Is the Massage (Columbia, 1967)

With Richard Kiley

- "Mowgli's Brothers" and "Tiger! Tiger!" (Leo the Lion Records, 1967)

With Pat McCormick

- Tell It Like It Is (Atco, 1968)

With David Frye

- I Am the President (Elektra, 1969); as Lady Bird Johnson, Julie Nixon, and charlady.
- Radio Free Nixon (Elektra, 1971); as Lady Bird, Martha Mitchell, and Julie Eisenhower

With William Griffis

- The Cricket in Times Square (Newberry Award Records, 1971); also feat. Herb Duncan, Aurora Jorgensen, George Selden and Lionel Wilson
- A Wrinkle in Time (Newberry Award Records, 1972); also feat. Corinne Orr, Earl Hammond and Malachy McCourt
