= Aspen (magazine) =

American arts magazine

Aspen, volume 1 issue 3, 1966, designed by Andy Warhol and David Dalton.

Aspen was a multimedia magazine published on an irregular schedule by Phyllis Johnson from 1965 to 1971. The magazine was based in New York City. Described by its publisher as "the first three-dimensional magazine," each issue came in a customized box or folder filled with materials in a variety of formats, including booklets, "flexidisc" phonograph recordings, posters, postcards and reels of super-8 movie film. Many of the leading figures in contemporary North American and British art and cultural criticism were editors, designers or contributors to Aspen. The magazine has remained of interest to students of the artistic ferment of the late 1960s; extensive documentation of Aspen's contents is available online at UbuWeb.

Issue #3 was designed by Andy Warhol and David Dalton. Published in December, 1966, the issue is housed in a box with graphics based on the packaging of "Fab" laundry detergent. Among its contents were a flip-book based on Warhol's film Kiss, and Jack Smith's film Buzzards Over Bagdad, a flexidisc by John Cale of the Velvet Underground, and a "ticket book" with excerpts of papers delivered at the Berkeley conference on LSD by Timothy Leary and others.

Issue #4, designed by Quentin Fiore, showcased the ideas of the Canadian cultural theorist Marshall McLuhan. Highlights of subsequent issues include critical essays by Roland Barthes and Susan Sontag; a multi-part cardboard sculpture by Tony Smith; sound recordings with accompanying printed scores by John Cage, Morton Feldman and La Monte Young; films by Robert Rauschenberg and Hans Richter; a recording by Yoko Ono and John Lennon; and a pre-publication excerpt of J. G. Ballard's novel Crash.

Issue #10 was devoted to Asian art and philosophy. It was published in 1971, and was the final issue of the magazine.

In 2014 MACBA, Barcelona Museum of Contemporary Art, organized an exhibit based on the magazine, The same year, an exhibition on the magazine was held at Muzeum Współczesne Wrocław. In 2016, London's Whitechapel Gallery also held a retrospective of the magazine and its wider cultural impacts.
