= War and Peace in the Global Village =

Book by Marshall McLuhan

- Authors: Marshall McLuhan, Quentin Fiore
- Language: English
- Publisher: Bantam Books
- Publication date: 1968
- Publication place: United States
- Media type: Print
- Pages: 190
- Dewey Decimal: 303.48/3
- LC Class: 68-19249

War and Peace in the Global Village is a 1968 book by Marshall McLuhan and Quentin Fiore. It contains a collage of images and text that illustrates the effects of electronic media and new technology on man. Marshall McLuhan used James Joyce's Finnegans Wake as a major inspiration for this study of war throughout history as an indicator as to how war may be conducted in the future. (1st Ed.: Bantam, NY; reissued by Gingko Press, 2001 ISBN 1-58423-074-6),

Joyce's Wake is claimed to be a gigantic cryptogram which reveals a cyclic pattern for the whole history of man through its Ten Thunders. Each "thunder" below is a 100-character portmanteau of other words to create a statement he likens to an effect that each technology has on the society into which it is introduced. In order to glean the most understanding out of each, the reader must break the portmanteau into separate words (and many of these are themselves portmanteaus of words taken from multiple languages other than English) and speak them aloud for the spoken effect of each word. There is much dispute over what each portmanteau truly denotes.

McLuhan claims that the ten thunders in Wake represent different stages in the history of man:

- Thunder 1: Paleolithic to Neolithic. Speech. Split of East/West. From herding to harnessing animals.
- Thunder 2: Clothing as weaponry. Enclosure of private parts. First social aggression.
- Thunder 3: Specialism. Centralism via wheel, transport, cities: civil life.
- Thunder 4: Markets and truck gardens. Patterns of nature submitted to greed and power.
- Thunder 5: Printing. Distortion and translation of human patterns and postures and pastors.
- Thunder 6: Industrial Revolution. Extreme development of print process and individualism.
- Thunder 7: Tribal man again. All choractors end up separate, private man. Return of choric.
- Thunder 8: Movies. Pop art, pop Kulch via tribal radio. Wedding of sight and sound.
- Thunder 9: Car and Plane. Both centralizing and decentralizing at once create cities in crisis. Speed and death.
- Thunder 10: Television. Back to tribal involvement in tribal mood-mud. The last thunder is a turbulent, muddy wake, and murk of non-visual, tactile man.

== Pain Caused by New Media (Page 16) ==
Early in the book, Marshall McLuhan introduces emphasis on media-induced discomfort. "The pain caused by new media and new technologies tends very much to fall into the category of 'referred pain,' such as skin trouble caused by the appendix or the heart."

The opposite of causing pain is also true. Numbing audiences via media systems to global village horrors. In a February 2025 interview, John Keane discussed the relevance of the 1968 book to modern-day whitewashing and "beautification" of warfare.
