= Harley Parker =

Canadian artist (1915–1992)

- Born: April 13, 1915; Fort William, Ontario, Canada
- Died: March 3, 1992 (aged 76); Vancouver, British Columbia

Harley Parker (April 13, 1915 – March 3, 1992) was a Canadian artist, designer, curator, professor and scholar - a frequent collaborator with fellow Canadian and communications theorist Marshall McLuhan.

Parker specialized in watercolour painting, and exhibited internationally. He was awarded numerous grants over his life, including two Canada Council Grants, and a British Council of the Arts Grant. He lectured all over the world, was published internationally, and collaborated closely with manifold scholars and thinkers, McLuhan among them.

== Life and career ==
Harley Parker was born in Fort William, Ontario in 1915. He graduated from the Ontario College of Art (OCA) in Toronto, Ontario in 1939, and from there went on to work independently as an artist. Years later, he taught color, design, and watercolor. In 1946, he attended and completed further studies at Black Mountain College in Virginia, studying under Josef Albers. Between the years of 1947 and 1957, Parker taught colour theory and design, as well as watercolour techniques, at the Ontario College of Art (OCA) in Toronto, Ontario.

In 1957, he assumed the position of Head of Design and Installations at the Royal Ontario Museum (ROM) in Toronto, a post which he retained for a decade, until 1967. During a year-long sabbatical leave from his teaching position, he became an associate professor at Fordham University sharing the Albert Schweitzer chair of communications with Professor Marshall McLuhan.

From 1967 until 1975, Parker became involved with McLuhan's Centre for Culture and Technology at the University of Toronto as a research associate. His work there revolved around investigating the relationships between the arts and sciences in the 20th century. It was during these years that he collaborated most closely with Marshall McLuhan, co-authoring two titles, Through the Vanishing Point: Space in Poetry and Painting and Counterblast.

In 1973, Parker was selected to be the first Institute Professor of Communications at the Rochester Institute of Technology, in Rochester, New York. He returned to Canada the following year to pick up his work with McLuhan's Centre for Culture and Technology.

Parker retired from his scholarly career in 1976, whereupon he moved to British Columbia to live and paint in the Kootenay Mountains. He participated in many solo and group exhibitions across Canada and the globe, both in solo and group shows, until his death in 1992.

== Bibliography ==
1. 1960 The Gutenberg Galaxy: A Voyage Between Two Worlds. Transcript of conversation with McLuhan, Harley Parker, and Robert Shafer (appeared in McLuhan's Report on Project in Understanding New Media).
2. 1967 "Picnic in Space." Interviewed with Marshall McLuhan. dir. Bruce Bacon. Retrieved from http://www.watershed.co.uk/mcluhan/picnic-in-space/
3. 1968 Through the Vanishing Point: Space in Poetry and Painting with Marshall McLuhan; 1st Ed.: Harper & Row, NY.
4. 1969 Counterblast, Marshall McLuhan, design/layout by Harley Parker; McClelland and Steward, Toronto.
