= Quentin Fiore =

American graphic designer (1920–2019)

- Born: February 12, 1920; The Bronx, New York City, United States
- Died: April 13, 2019 (aged 99); North Canaan, Connecticut, United States
- Education: Art Students League of New York
- Occupation: graphic designer
- Known for: working in books
- Spouse: Jeanne DeWolfe Raseman

Quentin Fiore (February 12, 1920 – April 13, 2019) was a graphic designer, who worked mostly in books.

== Early life and education ==
Quentin Fiore was born on February 12, 1920, in the Bronx, New York to Antonino, a tailor, and Bice (née Bononi) Fiore and was raised in Brooklyn. Fiore was a self-taught designer. His visual education came from a short period of painting and drawing classes in New York in the late 1930s at the Art Students League of New York with George Grosz and, later, Hans Hofmann. Fiore later studied at the "New Bauhaus" in Chicago.

He was a conscientious objector during World War II along with two of his four brothers. They were assigned to camps around the country fighting forest fires and rescuing lost or injured skiers. After the war in 1946, Fiore married Jeanne DeWolfe Raseman.

== Career ==
In the late 1940s, Fiore turned to graphic design and worked as an art director for Christian Dior and Bonwit Teller, later moving on to more corporate work for Ford Foundation, Bell Laboratories and RCA in the 1950s.

Fiore is noted especially by his designs of the 1960s, where he mixed text and images, different sizes of type and other unconventional devices to create dynamic pages that reflected the tumultuous spirit of the time. In the words of critic Steven Heller, Fiore was "as anarchic as possible while still working within the constraints of bookmaking". Of particular interest are his collaborations with media theorist Marshall McLuhan, such as The Medium is the Massage (1967). Initiated by Fiore, The Medium is the Massage didn't have a manuscript but was an amalgamation of McLuhan's previous works 1962 Gutenberg Galaxy and 1964 Understanding Media in an attempt to popularize McLuhan. The book has been described as the seed from which the idea that "consciousness can be affected by the knowing collision of verbal and visual information" sprouted. The style Fiore implemented in the book is a kinetic interpretation of the philosophy so that the complex ideas could be understandable to a visual audience. The typography within was at all different angles, superimposed on images, with some meant to be read in a mirror. The book received mixed reviews with its disregard of typographic rules, while others thought "it promoted illiteracy, encouraged drug use, it corrupted the morals of the American youth." The initial print run by Bantam consisted of 5,000 paperback copies, with a hardbound edition from Random House. The book was wildly successful with subsequent print runs and translations in German, Portuguese, Spanish, Japanese and Italian. Worldwide circulation was close to a million and McLuhan's largest-selling publication.

The style was pushed further in DO IT!: Scenarios of the Revolution (1970), the controversial yippie manifesto by social activist Jerry Rubin. Rubin collected most of the material for the book, working with Fiore when he was available and was later described as an important political statement.

In 1968 The Medium is the Massage was made into an LP (Columbia, CS 9501, CL 2701), combining readings of excerpts of the book with musical samples and original musical accompaniments. In 1999, a remastered version was released in CD format by SME Japan.

He died in North Canaan, Connecticut, on April 13, 2019, at the age of 99.

== Selected works ==
- The Medium is the Massage: An Inventory of Effects, with Marshall McLuhan (1967)
- War and Peace in the Global Village, with Marshall McLuhan (1968)
- DO IT!: Scenarios of the Revolution, by Jerry Rubin, introduction by Eldridge Cleaver (1970)
- I Seem to Be a Verb, with Buckminster Fuller (1970)
- Impressions of Lenin, by Angelica Balabanoff
- The Making of Kubrick's 2001
