= The Medium Is the Massage =

1967 book by Marshall McLuhan and Quentin Fiore

The Medium is the Massage: An Inventory of Effects
- Cover of the first UK paperback edition, published by Penguin Books (1967)
- Author: Marshall McLuhan
- Illustrator: Quentin Fiore
- Language: English
- Subjects: History of communication Communications
- Publisher: Penguin Books
- Publication date: 1967
- Publication place: United Kingdom
- Pages: 157
- OCLC: 308404

The Medium is the Massage: An Inventory of Effects is a book co-created by media analyst Marshall McLuhan and graphic designer Quentin Fiore, with coordination by Jerome Agel. It was published by Bantam Books in 1967 and became a bestseller with a cult following. The U.K. edition was published by Allen Lane Penguin Books using cover art by Newsweek photographer Tony Rollo.

The book is 160 pages in length and composed in an experimental, collage style with text superimposed on visual elements and vice versa. Some pages are printed backwards and are meant to be read in a mirror. Some are intentionally left blank. Most contain photographs and images both modern and historic, juxtaposed in startling ways.

== Origin of the title ==
The title is a play on McLuhan's often-quoted phrase "The medium is the message." The book was initiated by Quentin Fiore. McLuhan adopted the term "massage" to denote the effect of numerous media in how they massage the human sensorium.

According to biographer, W. Terrence Gordon:

By the time it appeared in 1967, McLuhan recognized his saying was a cliché, and welcomed the opportunity to throw it back on the compost heap of language to recycle and revitalize it. But the new title is more than McLuhan indulging his insatiable taste for puns, more than a clever fusion of self-mockery and self-rescue — the subtitle is 'An Inventory of Effects,' underscoring the lesson compressed into the original saying.

However, the FAQ section on the website maintained by McLuhan's estate says Gordon's interpretation is incomplete and makes its leap of logic for McLuhan to leave it as is:

Why is the title of the book The Medium is the Massage and not The Medium is the Message? The title is a mistake. After the book came back from the typesetter's, it had on the cover 'Massage'. The title was supposed to read The Medium is the Message, but the typesetter made an error. After McLuhan saw the typo, he exclaimed, 'Leave it alone! It's great, and right on target!' Now there are four readings for the last word of the title, all of them accurate: Message and Mess Age, Massage and Mass Age.

== The "Environment" ==
"Because McLuhan's terminology is specific in his use of 'environment' and 'counterenvironment' from 1965 onward (when he returns to this concept as a way of clarifying his saying 'the medium is the message'), one must emphasize that in his usage 'environment' is not essentially a spatial term, nor one that relates to nature, or even necessarily to place".

== Summary ==
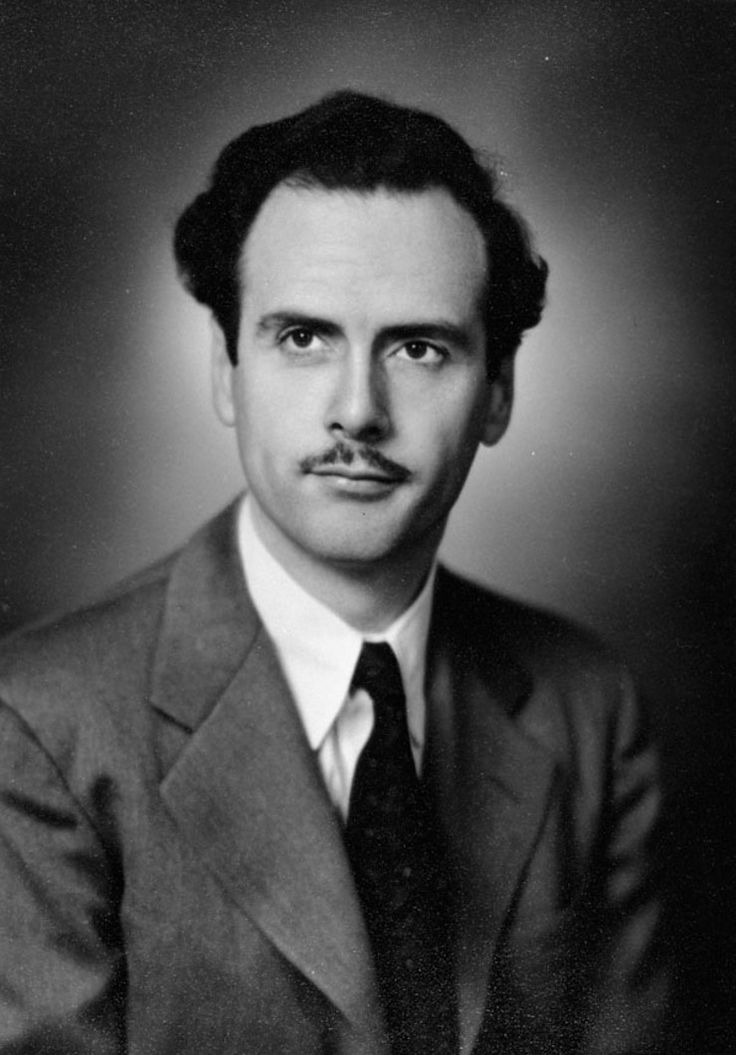
Marshall McLuhan

Marshall McLuhan argues that technologies—from clothing to the wheel to the book and beyond—are the messages, rather than the content of the communication. Basically, in its fundamental essence, The Medium is the Massage is a graphical and creative representation of his "medium is the message" thesis explored in Understanding Media.

By playing on words and using the term "massage," McLuhan suggests that modern audiences enjoy mainstream media as soothing, enjoyable, and relaxing. However, the pleasure we find in these media is deceiving, as the changes between society and technology are incongruent, perpetuating an "Age of Anxiety".

All media work us over completely. They are so pervasive in their personal, political, economic, aesthetic, psychological, moral, ethical, and social consequences, they leave no part of us untouched, unaffected, unaltered. (p. 26).

The Medium is the Massage demonstrates the ways the mainstream media are extensions of human senses; they ground us in physicality, but expand our ability to perceive our world to an extent impossible without them. These extensions of perception contribute to McLuhan's theory of the global village, which would bring humanity full-circle to an industrial analogue of tribal mentality.

Finally, McLuhan describes points of change in how people view their universe and the ways in which those views are affected and altered by the adoption of new mainstream media. "The technique of invention was the discovery of the [19th century]," brought on by the adoption of fixed points of view and perspective by typography; while "[t]he technique of the suspended judgment is the discovery of the twentieth century," brought on by the bard abilities of radio, movie, and television programming.

Fiore, at the time a prominent graphic designer and communications consultant, composed the visual illustration of these effects compiled by Jerome Agel. Near the beginning of the book, Fiore adopted a pattern in which an image demonstrating a MainStream media effect was presented with a textual synopsis on the facing page. The reader experiences a repeated shifting of analytic registers—from "reading" typographic print to "scanning" photographic facsimiles—reinforcing McLuhan's argument in this book: each mainstream medium produces a different "massage" or "effect" on the human sensorium.

== Related project ==
An audio recording based on the book was released by Columbia Records in 1967, produced by John Simon but otherwise keeping the same credits as the book. The recording consists of a pastiche of statements made by McLuhan interrupted by other speakers, using various phonations and falsettos, discordant sounds and incidental music in what could be considered a deliberate attempt to translate the disconnected images seen on TV into an audio format, resulting in the prevention of a connected stream of conscious thought. Various audio recording techniques and statements are used to illustrate the relationship between spoken, literary speech and the characteristics of electronic audio media. McLuhan biographer Philip Marchand called the recording "the 1967 equivalent of a McLuhan video."

== See also ==
- Hot and cool media
