= Palais Bourbon =

Seat of the National Assembly in Paris, France

Coordinates: 48°51′43″N 2°19′07″E

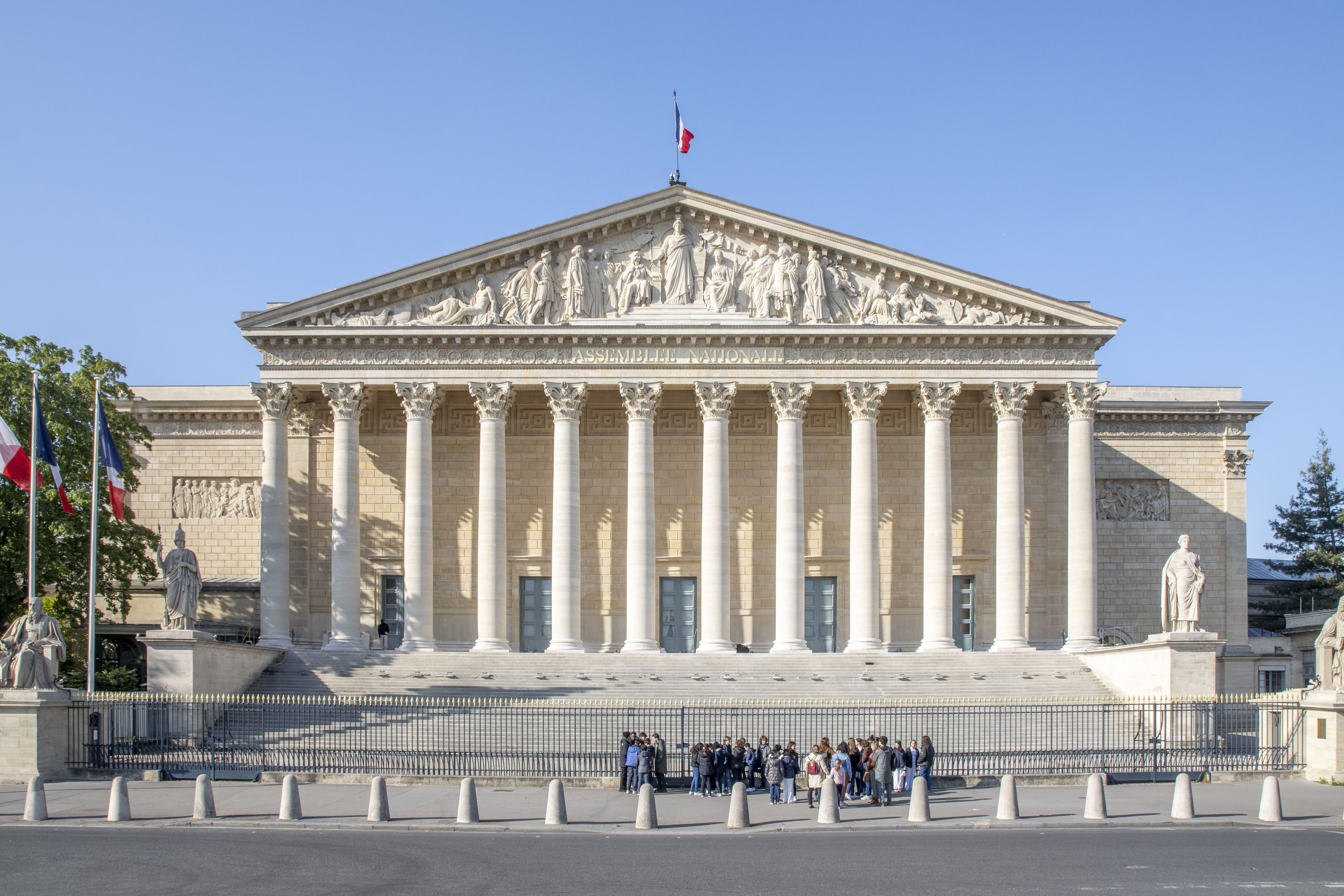
- North façade of the Palais Bourbon

General information
- Architectural style: French Baroque; Neoclassical
- Location: 7th arrondissement, Paris, France, 126 Rue de l'Université
- Current tenants: National Assembly
- Named for: Louise Françoise de Bourbon
- Construction started: 1722; 304 years ago
- Completed: 1728; 298 years ago
- Renovated: 1765–1788, 1795, 1828
- Owner: French State

Technical details
- Floor area: 124,000 m^{2}

Design and construction
- Architects: Lorenzo Giardini, Pierre Cailleteau, Jean Aubert and Jacques Gabriel

Renovating team
- Architects: Bernard Poyet, Jules de Joly

Website
- www.assemblee-nationale.fr

The Palais Bourbon (pronounced [palɛ buʁbɔ̃]) is the meeting place of the National Assembly, the lower legislative chamber of the French Parliament. It is in the 7th arrondissement of Paris, on the Rive Gauche of the Seine across from the Place de la Concorde. The official address is on the Rue de l'Université, facing the Place du Palais-Bourbon.

The original palace was built beginning in 1722 for Louise Françoise de Bourbon, Duchess of Bourbon, the legitimised daughter of Louis XIV and the Marquise de Montespan. Four successive architects – Lorenzo Giardini, Pierre Cailleteau, Jean Aubert and Ange-Jacques Gabriel – completed the palace in 1728. It was then confiscated from Louis Joseph, Prince of Condé, during the French Revolution and nationalised. From 1795 to 1799, during the Directory, it was the meeting place of the Council of Five Hundred, which chose the government leaders. Beginning in 1806, during Napoleon Bonaparte's First French Empire, Bernard Poyet's Neoclassical façade was added to mirror that of the Église de la Madeleine, facing it across the Seine beyond the Place de la Concorde.

The palace complex today has a floor area of 124,000 m^{2} (1,330,000 sq ft), with over 9,500 rooms, in which 3,000 people work. The complex includes the Hôtel de Lassay on the west side of the Palais Bourbon, the official residence of the president of the National Assembly.

== History ==
=== An aristocratic palace in Paris (1726–1789) ===
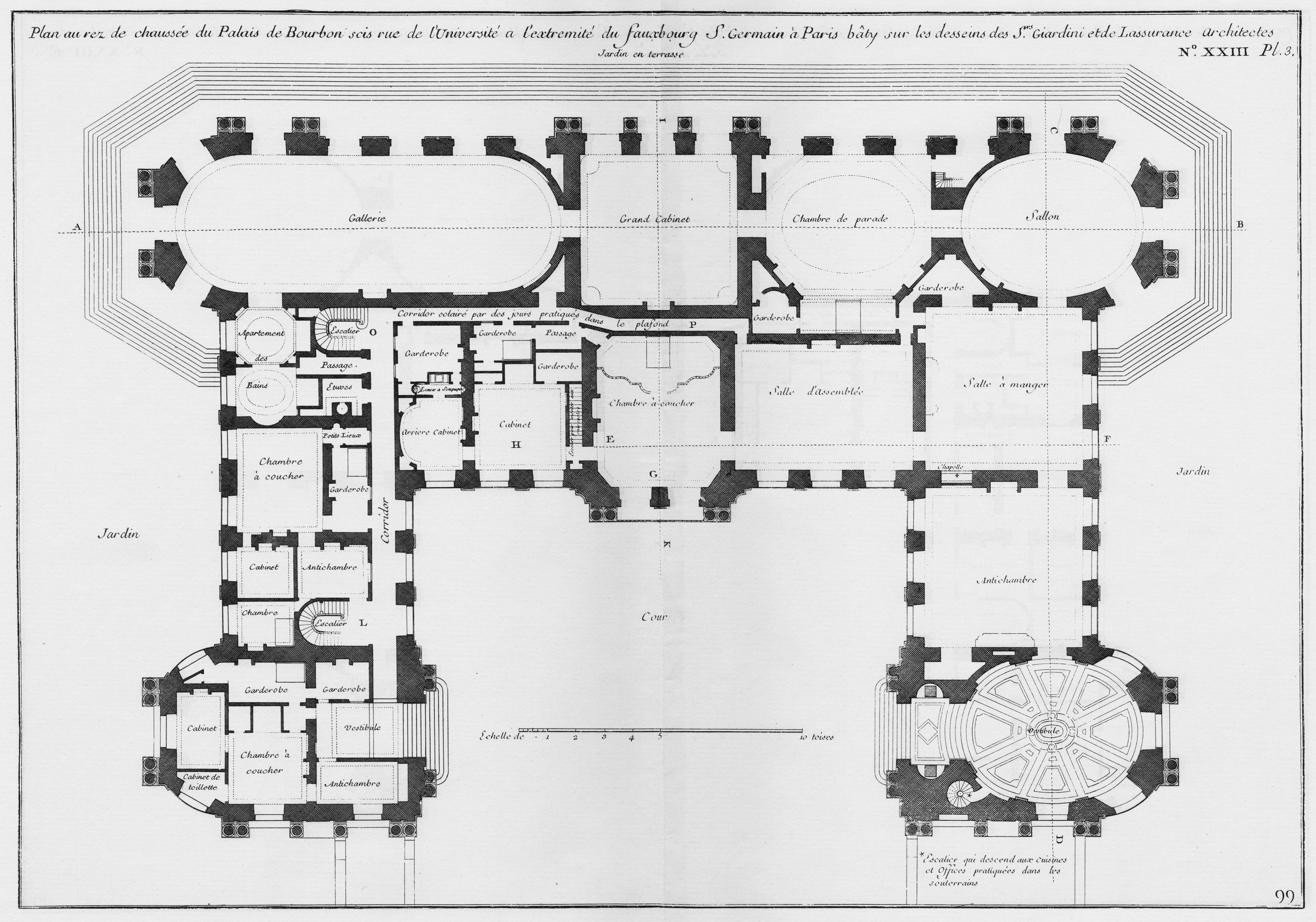
Plan of the ground floor of the Palais Bourbon (1752)

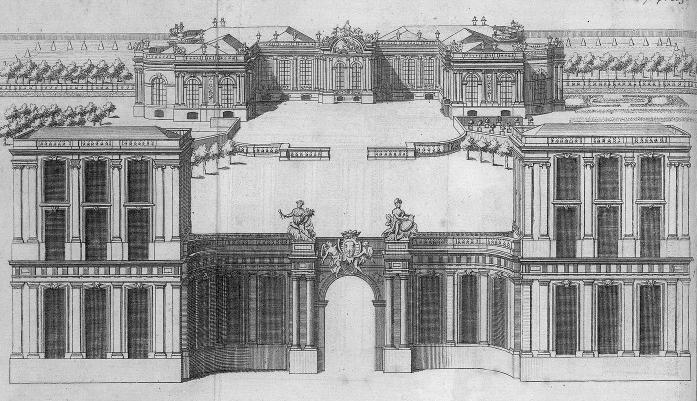
Drawing of the Palais Bourbon in 1730

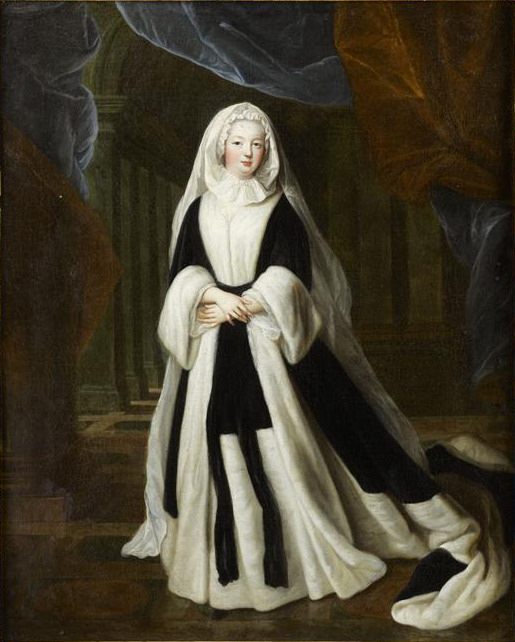
Louise Françoise de Bourbon, the creator of the Palais Bourbon, shown as a widow (1737)

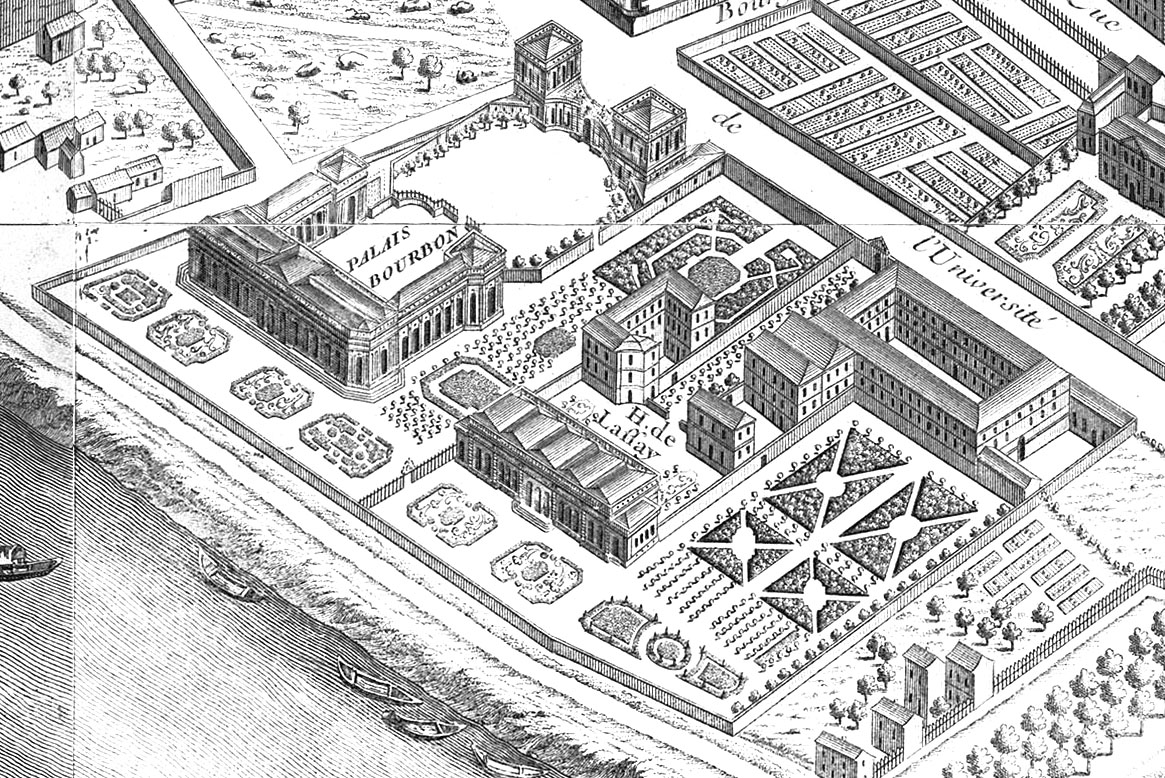
The Palais Bourbon (upper left) and the Hôtel de Lassay (lower right), as depicted on the Turgot map of Paris (1739)

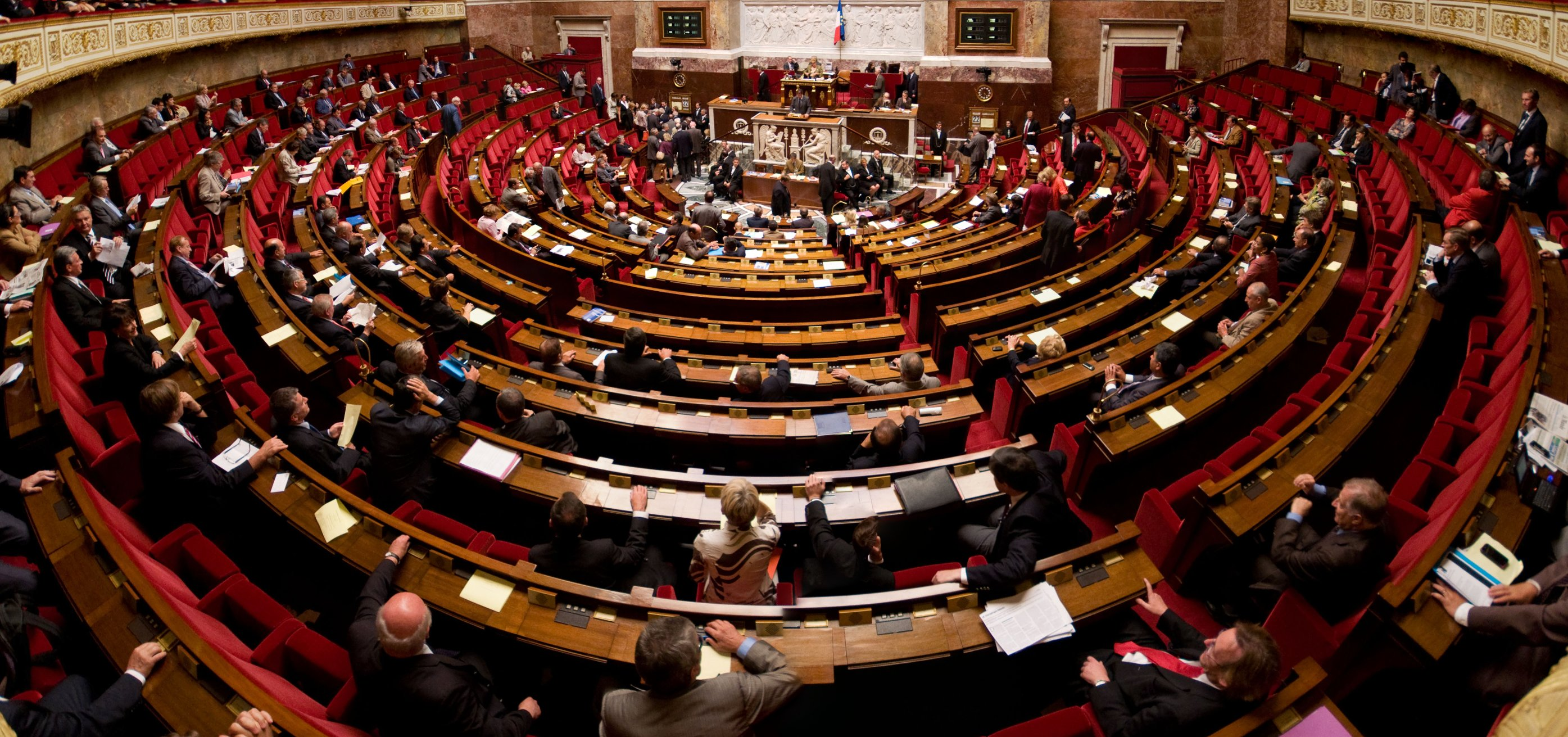
The National Assembly in session in the Palais Bourbon

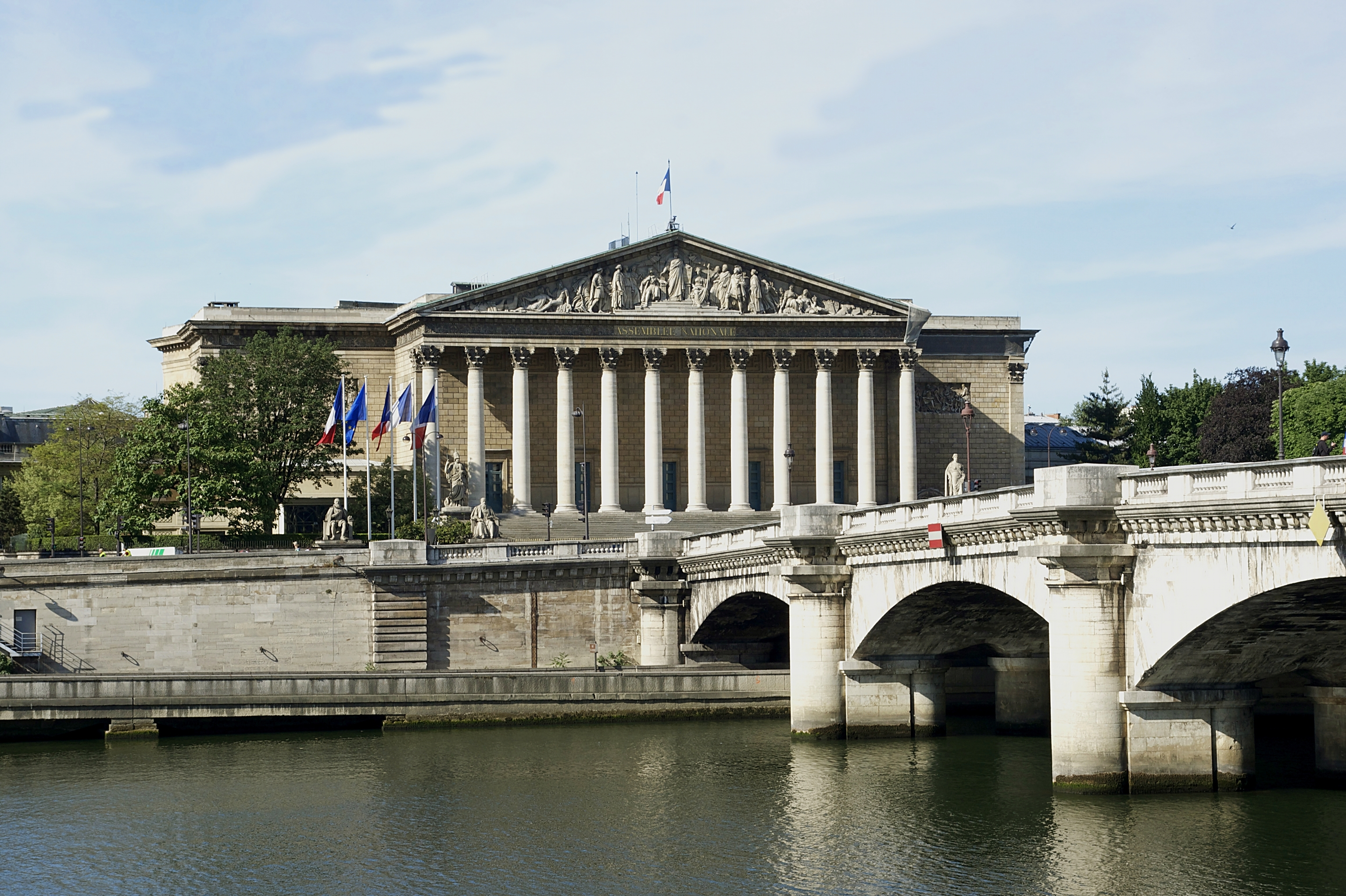
The classical portico added to the Palais Bourbon in 1806–08 by Napoleon Bonaparte

The palace was built for Louise Françoise de Bourbon, Duchess of Bourbon (1673–1743), the legitimised daughter of Louis XIV and Madame de Montespan. Begun in 1722 and finished in 1728, it was located in what was then a largely rural quarter at the edge of Paris, which was about to become a very fashionable residential neighbourhood, the Faubourg Saint-Germain. Until that time, the area, called the Pré-au-Clercs, was a wooded area popular for fighting duels. After the death of Louis XIV in 1715, following the example of the Regent, the aristocracy began to move their residences from Versailles back to Paris. As building-space land was scarce in the traditional residential area of the nobility and the densely populated Marais, the aristocracy of the Régence looked for land with space for gardens at the edges of the city, either near the Champs-Élysées, on the right bank, or on the left bank.

The Duchess of Bourbon had been known for frivolity at the court in Versailles, but by the 1720s, she had had seven children and was widowed. The reputed lover of the Duchess, Armand de Madaillan de Lesparre, Comte de Lassay, proposed the site of the palace to her; he had purchased land next door along the Seine, and the two buildings were constructed at the same time. The parcel of land for the new palace was large, extending from the Seine to the Rue de l'Université.

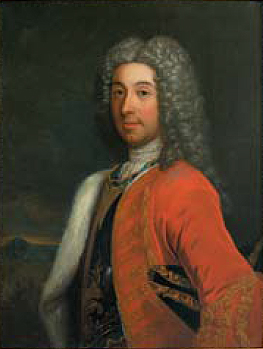
The Marquis of Lassay

The original plan called for a country residence surrounded by gardens, modelled after the Grand Trianon at Versailles, designed by Jules Hardouin-Mansart, the chief architect of Louis XIV. The Italian architect Lorenzo Giardini made the first plan, but he died in 1722, having made only first sketches. The project was taken over by Pierre Cailleteau, also known as Lassurance, who had been an assistant to Hardouin-Mansart. Cailleteau had worked on the Palace of Versailles and Les Invalides, and he knew the royal style very well, but he died in 1724. He was replaced by Jean Aubert, also a former assistant of Hardouin-Mansart. Aubert had built one of the grandest projects of the time, the stables of the royal residence at Chantilly. In the meantime, the construction of the neighbouring Hôtel de Lassay had begun, following a plan by another noted architect, Ange-Jacques Gabriel, the designer of the buildings around the now-Place de la Concorde. Both buildings were finished in 1728.

Both the Palais Bourbon and the Hôtel de Lassay were in the Italian style, with roofs hidden by balustrades and invisible from street level. The Palais Bourbon was in a U-shape. The main building was parallel to the Seine, with two wings enclosing a courtyard. The entrance to the courtyard and building was on the Rue de l'Université. The entrance to the courtyard had an ornate archway, flanked by two pavilions. The Hôtel de Lassay was rectangular and more modest in size. The two buildings had identical façades facing the Seine, and featured alternating columns and windows, and decoration on the themes of the seasons, the elements, and, fitting for the daughter of the Sun King, about Apollo. The space between the buildings, and between the buildings and the Seine, was filled with gardens. In addition to the large reception rooms, the interior of the house had many small salons which could be arranged for a variety of purposes. It also had a novelty for buildings of the period; corridors, so one could pass through the building without walking through the rooms. None of the original apartments of the Duchess survive; as they were destroyed in the subsequent remodellings. The Duchesse de Bourbon died in 1743, and de Lassay died in 1750. The palace was purchased by Louis XV, who seems to have wished to include it in the plan of the new Place Louis XV (now the Place de la Concorde) which he was building on the other side of the river. But in 1756 he sold it to grandson of the Duchess, Louis Joseph, Prince of Condé, who had been a military hero in the just-concluded Seven Years' War. The Prince decided to largely rebuild it, turning it from a country house into a monumental palace, in the new Neoclassical style. With this in mind, in 1768 he purchased the neighbouring Hôtel de Lassay, and planned to make the two buildings into one. A new plan was drawn by Marie-Joseph Peyre, whose style was based on archeological studies of ancient Rome and Greece. Peyre's other neoclassical works included the Odéon Theatre. Several different architects were engaged in the project, including Jacques-Germain Soufflot, Bellisard and Charpentier.

For the Neoclassical palace of the Prince, the entrance on the Rue de l'Université was replaced by a larger and more impressive gate, framed by a gallery of columns. The two wings of the building were extended, and a pavilion was created with apartments for one of his sons. An abundance of military decoration, including stucco sculptures of shields and weapons, was added to the vestibule, and are still visible today. The palace was only finished at the end of the 1780s, at the same time that the French Revolution began. The Prince went into exile following the storming of the Bastille, thus becoming an émigré in the eyes of Revolutionaries, and the two residences were confiscated by the Revolutionary government in 1791.

=== The Revolution, Consulate, and Empire (1789–1814) ===
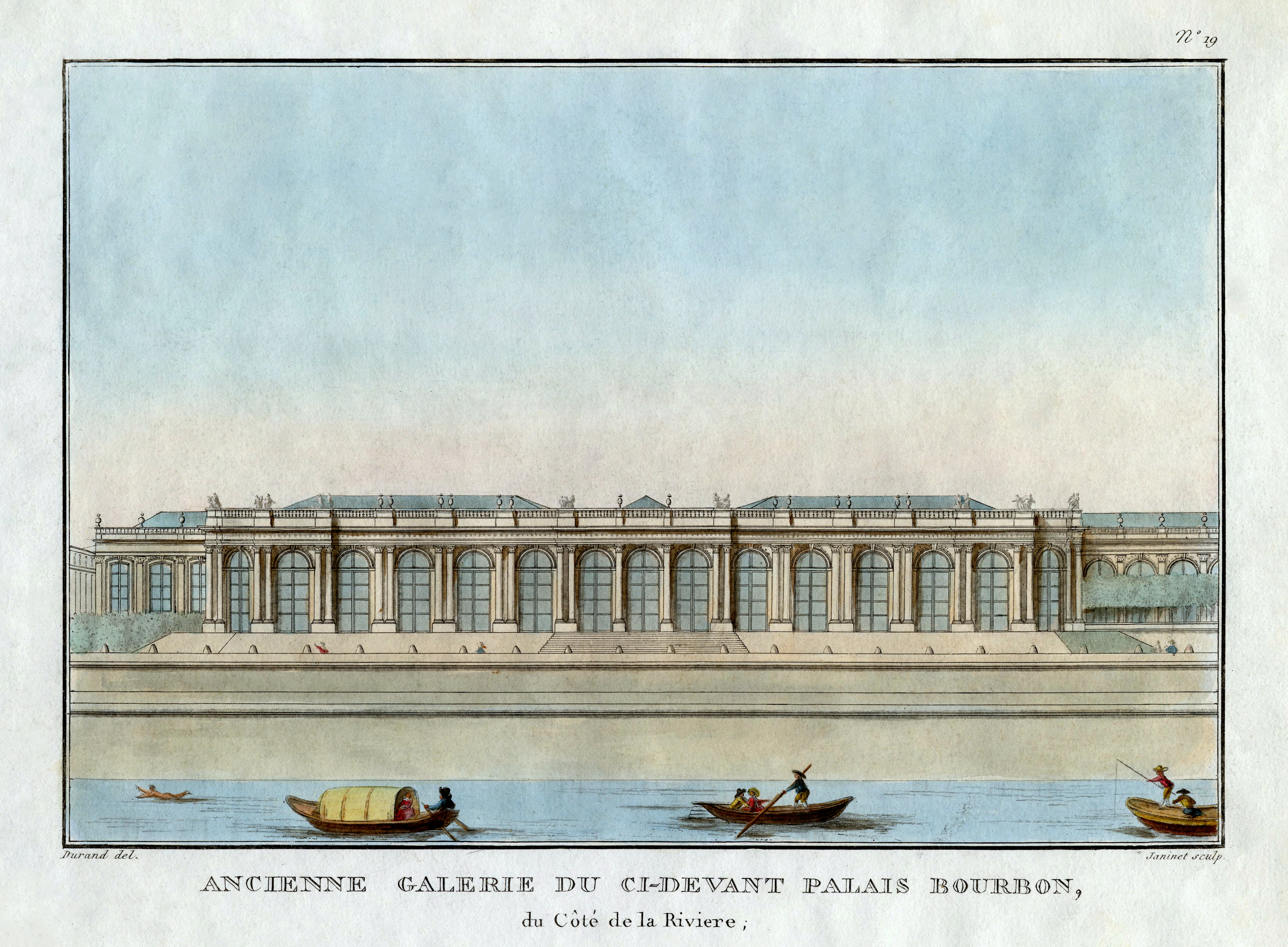
Façade of the Palais Bourbon facing the Seine (beginning of the 19th century)

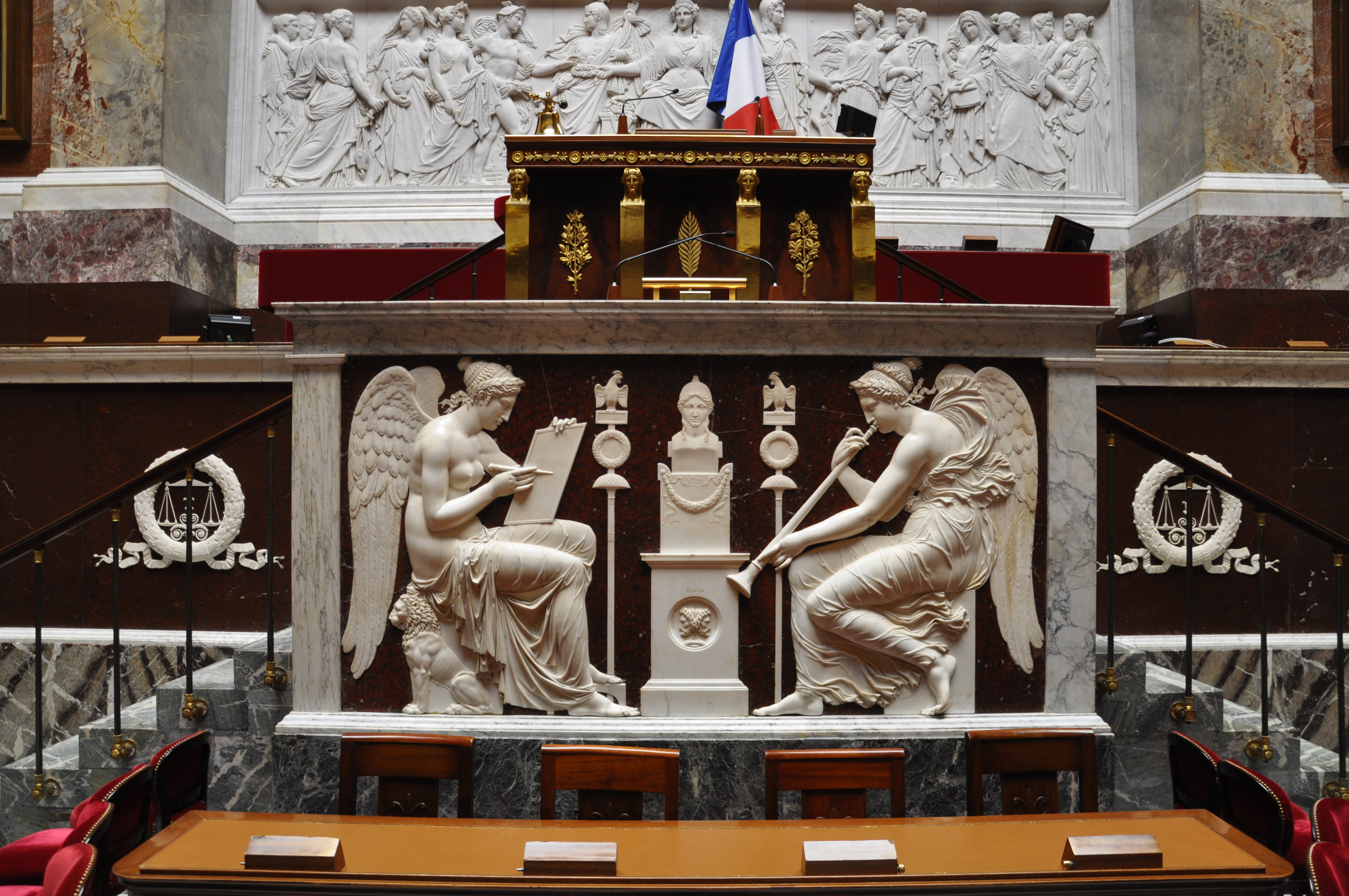
The desk of the president of the National Assembly, designed by Jacques-Louis David, and the tribune of the Chamber, with bas-relief of History and Fame by François-Frédéric Lemot (1797–98)

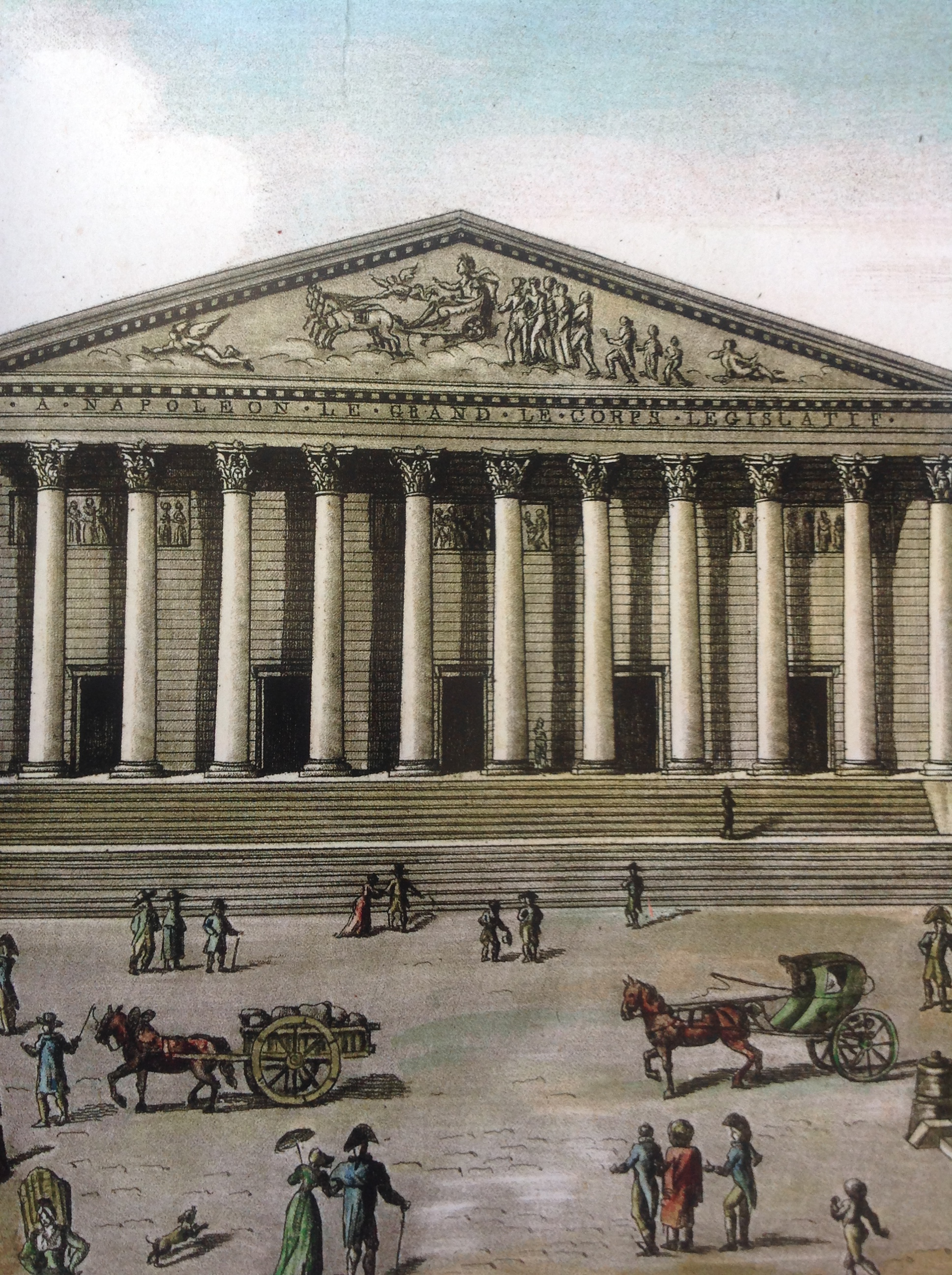
First project of the new façade along the Seine, by Poyet (1806)

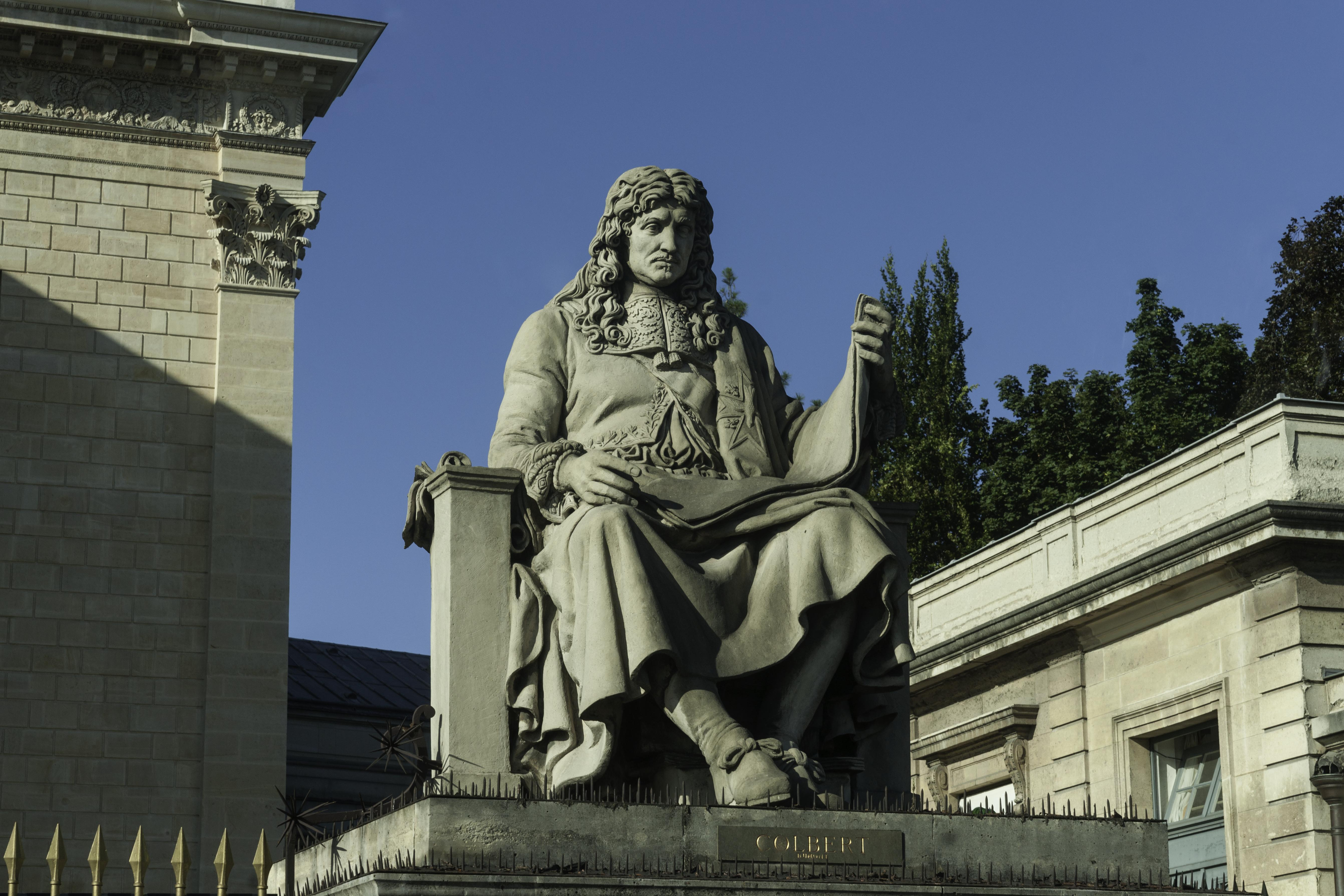
Statue of Jean-Baptiste Colbert, added with statues of other famous royal ministers in 1810

The first French National Assembly gathered without royal authorisation on 20 June 1789 in the tennis court of the Palace of Versailles. the first step of the French Revolution, and in May 1793 moved to the empty theatre of the Tuileries Palace in Paris. Most of the aristocracy had fled France for its safety, and the Palais Bourbon and Hôtel de Lassay, like the Luxembourg Palace, Élysée Palace, Hôtel Matignon, and countless other estates were nationalised and used for government functions. The stables of the palace became the headquarters of the administration of military transport, while the Palais Bourbon became, in 1794, the Central School of Public Works, which later became, under Napoleon Bonaparte, the École Polytechnique, the famous military engineering school.

In 1793 and 1794 the Revolution reached its peak of fury and disorder, under the Convention led by Robespierre and Saint-Just. The two leaders of the Terror were arrested and executed on 28 July 1794, and a new government, the Directory, took power. On 23 September 1795 a new constitution was adopted, which called for a parliament with two Chambers, the Council of Five Hundred, the future National Assembly, and the Council of the Ancients. The Council of Five Hundred was given the Palais Bourbon as its future meeting place. The new government commissioned the architects Jacques-Pierre Gisors and Emmanuel-Cherubin Leconte to turn the apartments of the palace along the Seine into a meeting Chamber. The Chamber they designed was in the shape of a hemicycle, similar to a Roman theatre, and was covered with a cupola modelled after that of the amphitheatre of the Academy of Surgery, located not far away in Saint-Germain-des-Prés, which had been built between 1769 and 1774. A few other changes were made to the palace; a vestibule and rotunda was added in the courtyard, and a wooden gallery was constructed to connect the palace with the Hôtel de Lassay.

Two features of the original Chamber can still be found in the current Chamber; the desk and armchair of the president of the National Assembly, made of wood and gilded bronze, designed in a classical Roman style by Jacques-Louis David and the bas-relief behind the tribune, made of carved white marble framed in dark polychrome marble. It features two female figures representing allegorical figures of History and Fame. Fame is announcing the laws with a long trumpet, while History is inscribing them on a tablet. In the center is a bust of Marianne, a symbol of the French Republic, wearing a medallion of the Roman god Janus, whose two faces illustrate the motto that the experience of the past predicts the future. The construction of the Chamber drastically modified the building, as the roof had to be raised well above the old façade. It was also out of alignment with the long axis composed of the Église de la Madeleine, the Place de la Concorde, and the Pont de la Concorde; the view of the Palais Bourbon from the Place de la Concorde was blocked by the decoration of the bridge.

The Council of Five Hundred began meeting on 21 January 1798, a date chosen because it was the anniversary of the murder of the 'last tyrant', King Louis XVI. The members arrived dressed in Roman togas and caps, in the Neoclassical fashion. They quickly found out that the new Chamber had little ventilation, was feebly heated in winter, and the acoustics were poor, making it hard to hear the speakers. On 8 November 1799 Napoleon Bonaparte organized a coup d'état and seized power from the Council of Five Hundred, then meeting at the château de Saint-Cloud. Napoleon formed a new legislature, the Corps législatif, whose only duty was to listen to an annual speech by him, now First Consul, and to adopt the laws proposed by the Council of State, debated by another new body, the Tribunat.

In 1806 the bureau of the Corps législatif proposed the construction of a new façade facing the Seine, which would be aligned with and would match that of the Temple of Glory (which would later be restored to being the Église de la Madeleine) which Napoleon was building at the end of Rue Royale, to the north of the Place de la Concorde. The new Neoclassical façade, designed by architect Bernard Poyet, had twelve corinthian columns in an entirely different style from the Italianate 18th century palace behind it, but it was high enough to be visible from the Place de la Concorde and was correctly aligned to be visible from the Madeleine. The original fronton of the façade featured bas-reliefs by sculptor Antoine-Denis Chaudet, showed scenes from the opening of the Corps législatif in 1806; it showed Napoleon on horseback, offering to the members of the Legislature the flags which had been captured from the Austrians at the Battle of Austerlitz, and the inscription, 'To Napoleon I the Great – the Corps législatif'. In 1810, statues of the goddess Themis, holding a scale in her left hand, and Athena, the symbol of wisdom, were placed in front of the façade on the Seine, along with statues of famous royal ministers, Maximilien de Béthune, Duke of Sully, Jean-Baptiste Colbert, and Henri François d'Aguesseau, Poyet made two important modifications to the interior; he added two salons, the Salle des Gardes and the Salon de l'Empereur, which was intended for the use of Napoleon during his rare visits to the building. Both these rooms retain much of their original decor, trompe-l'oeil paintings by Alexandre-Évariste Fragonard, the son of the famous court painter of Louis XIV.

=== Bourbon Restoration and Louis Philippe: the Chamber of Deputies ===
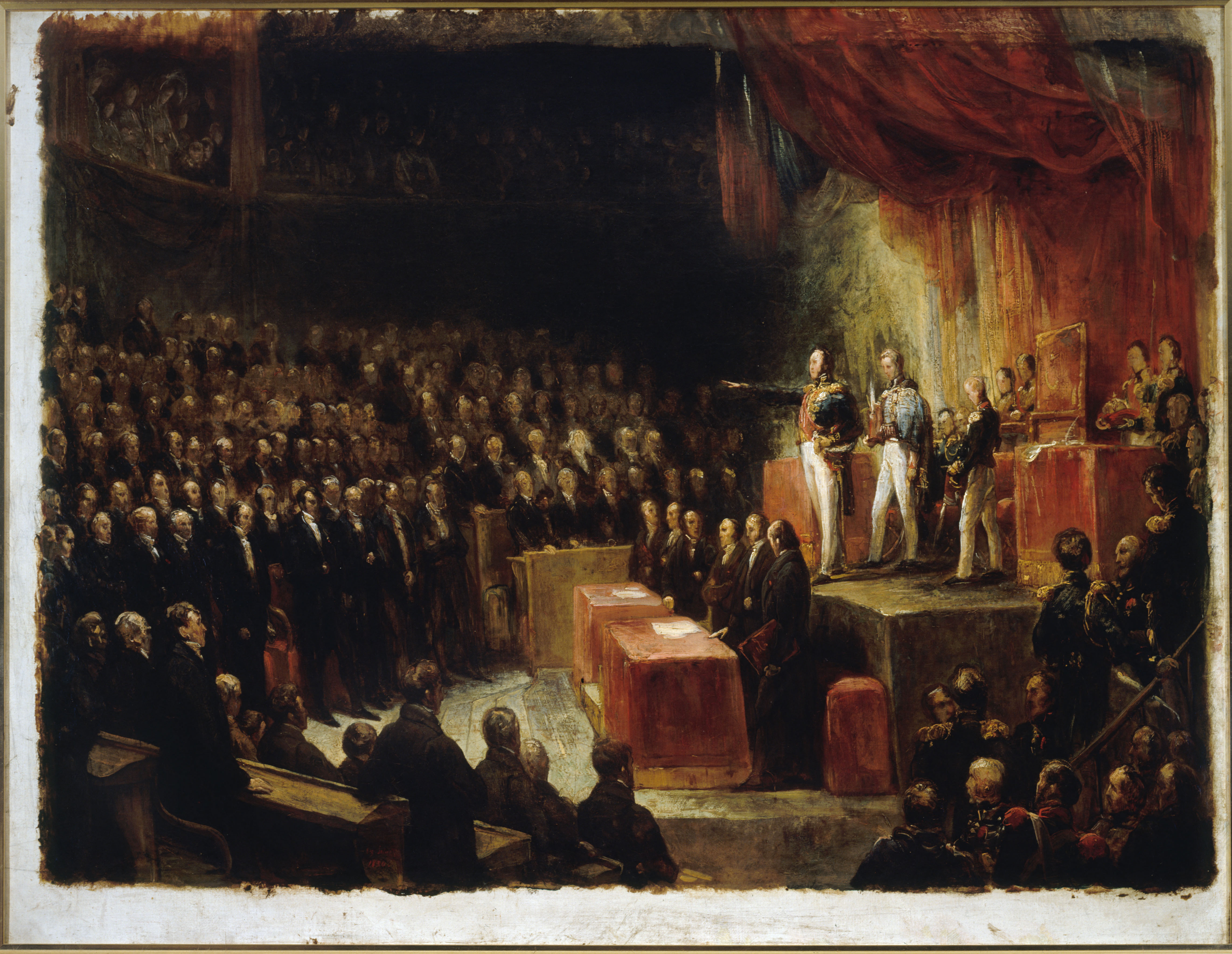
Louis Philippe takes his oath before the two Chambers (1830), painting by Ary Scheffer

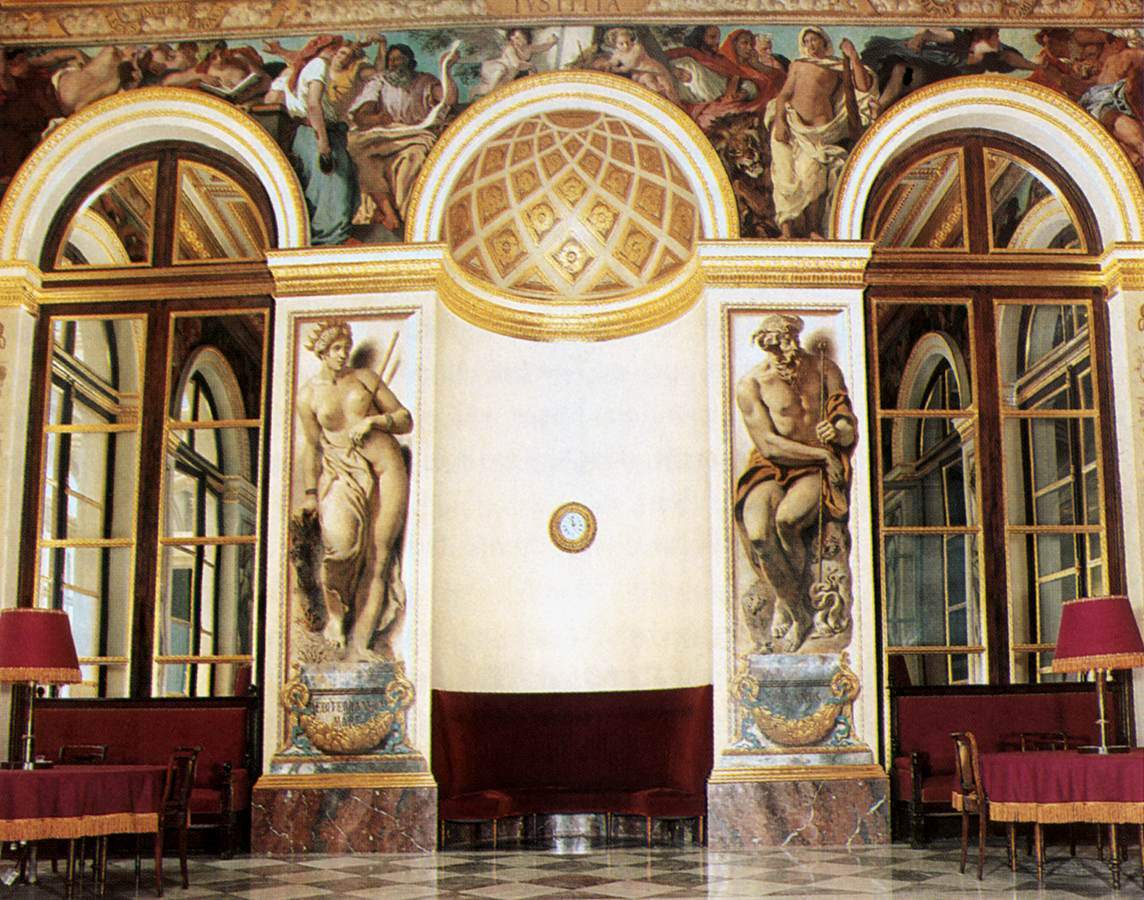
The Salon of the King, decorated by Eugène Delacroix (1833–1838)

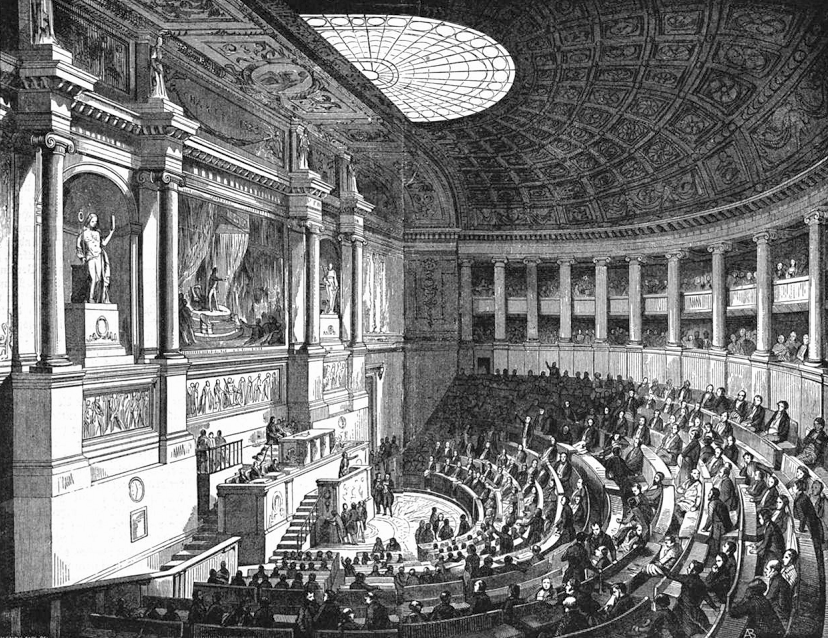
The Chamber of Deputies in 1843

The library, with paintings by Eugène Delacroix (1838–1846)

After the fall of Napoleon in 1814, the House of Bourbon was restored under Louis XVIII, but preserved some of the democratic institutions begun during the Revolution. The new government, like the Directory, featured a legislature with two houses, the Chamber of Deputies and the Senate. The Palais Bourbon was formally returned to its aristocratic owner, the Prince of Condé, who had returned from exile. However, the building had been so modified it was impossible to use as a residence; the Prince rented a large part of the palace to the new Chamber of Deputies. The first modification made by the new government, in July 1815, just a month after Napoleon's final defeat at Waterloo, was to erase the inscription to Napoleon, the five bas-reliefs and the numerous Ns and eagles that had been carved on the façades. The bas-relief featuring Napoleon on the Seine façade was replaced by a plaster bas-relief by Alexandre-Évariste Fragonard of Louis XVIII signing the Charter of 1814, the founding document of the new government. The Chamber of Deputies continued to rent the space until 1827, when it finally bought the building from the House of Condé for 5,250,000 francs. Busts of Louis XVI, Louis XVII, and Louis XVIII were also added.

The meeting hall was in a deplorable condition, so the Chamber decided on a major renovation. The architect Jules de Joly (1788–1865) who had been the official architect of the Chamber since 1821, was selected for the task. The architect proposed four possible new shapes for the hall; an ellipse, rectangle, octagon and hemicycle, but the Chamber decided to keep the original hemicycle. De Joly also was asked to redesign the three salons which faced the cour d'honneur. The plan was submitted in January 1828, approved in April 1829, and the first stone was placed on 4 November 1829. Over three hundred workers were engaged on the project, one of the largest undertaken in Paris during the Restoration. Work continued, despite the Revolution of 1830 that brought down the House of Bourbon and replaced it with a new dynasty. Louis Philippe d'Orléans, proclaimed King of the French, came to take the oath to the Chamber in its temporary meeting place. A second project, that of constructing a library, was commenced in April 1831. The new interior was completed in September 1832, and formally inaugurated by Louis Philippe on 19 November 1832.

The meeting hall of the deputies kept the same hemicycle form, but the floor was lowered, giving greater height to the ceiling, and increasing the height of the tribune and the desk of the president. A colonnade and balconies, in the form of an arch of triumph, was constructed behind the tribune, giving the appearance of a theatrical stage. The central panel above and behind the tribune was occupied by a large painting of Louis Philippe taking his oath before the Assembly. Niches were constructed on either side of the tribune, with statues of 'Liberty' and 'Public Order' by Pradet. The four columns of the arch were decorated with statues representing Force, Justice, Prudence and Eloquence.

The plan by Joly also turned the building around. Under Napoleon, the main entrance, where he entered for his annual address, was on the Seine, under the grand colonnade. Under the new plan, the main entrance was placed on the courtyard, where a delegation of deputies met the Louis Philippe, when he came to the building each year to open the session. To give this entrance greater prominence, Joly constructed a Neoclassical portico with four Corinthian columns, modelled after the ancient Temple of Jupiter Stator. Joly's project greatly increased the interior space of the building, adding three new salons (now the Salons Delacroix, Casimir-Périer, and Abel de Pujol). Under the new plan, it was possible to go from one wing of the building to the other without having to cross the courtyard or pass through the meeting Chamber.

In 1837 a new project was begun to finish the exterior decoration, particularly on the façade facing the Seine. The original three bas-reliefs on the façade beneath the colonnade had been removed with the fall of the Empire, and were not replaced; but two new works replaced other Napoleonic bas-reliefs; Prometheus animating the arts by Rude and Public Education by James Pradier. The bas-relief on the fronton, which had originally depicted Napoleon bringing the flags of Austerlitz to the Assembly, was replaced by a new work by Corton entitled France supported by Force and Justice. For the new entry portico on the courtyard, Joly commissioned two new statues by Gayard; titled France and Liberty. These two statues were not installed until 1860, under Napoleon III, and were given new names; Force and France deposits her ballot in the voting urn.

The interior minister of Louis Philippe and future president of France, Adolphe Thiers, oversaw the interior decoration of the Assembly. He selected the promising young painter Eugène Delacroix, just 25 years old, to paint murals for the Salon of the King (Salon du Roi), though Louis Philippe, in fact, detested Delacroix's style. Between 1833 and 1838 Delacroix created a series of allegorical figures representing Justice, Truth, Prudence, War, Industry, and Agriculture. The murals are preserved in what is now called the Salon Delacroix. Another salon, known as the Salon de la Paix, was decorated with allegories by Horace Vernet, illustrating two themes important to Louis Philippe's regime: peace in Europe and the expansion of commerce and industry. They showed French ships carrying goods from the new French colonies in Africa, ships in the port of Marseille, the textile mills of Lyon, and a locomotive of the new railways. A third salon was painted by Abel de Pujol, who painted scenes from the history of governments in France, from Charlemagne to Louis Philippe.

The project of reconstruction included a new library, on the east side of the palace. The style was highly classical, and resembled that of the ancient Roman baths; pillars supported five cupolas, over a gallery closed by two semi-circular bays. The lighting came from a recent innovation, skylights; it was later copied in the National Library of France. The painter Eugène Delacroix was commissioned to paint the interior, a project which lasted from 1838 until 1846. Supported by a team of assistants, Delacroix painted the five cupolas and the two hemicycles of the library with a series of allegorical paintings on the themes of philosophy, natural history, legislation, eloquence, literature, poetry and theology; a panorama of all the aspects of civilisation.

Despite the new construction, the Chamber of Deputies was still desperately short of space for meeting rooms and offices. The president lived far from the palace – first on the Rue de Lille then on Place Vendôme. The Chamber purchased the west wing of the palace in 1830, and the Hôtel de Lassay in 1843. Joly once again was the architect chosen to redo the building; his plan called adding another story and restoring, as much as possible, the original Italianate style, both inside and outside. The result was a building which was more intimate and elegant than its Neoclassical neighbor. The work was begun in 1845, and was nearly finished when the French Revolution of 1848 broke out. After days of turmoil and fighting, Louis Philippe abdicated and fled France. The Chamber of Deputies was dissolved, opening the way for the French Second Republic.

=== The Second Republic and Second Empire (1848–1870) ===
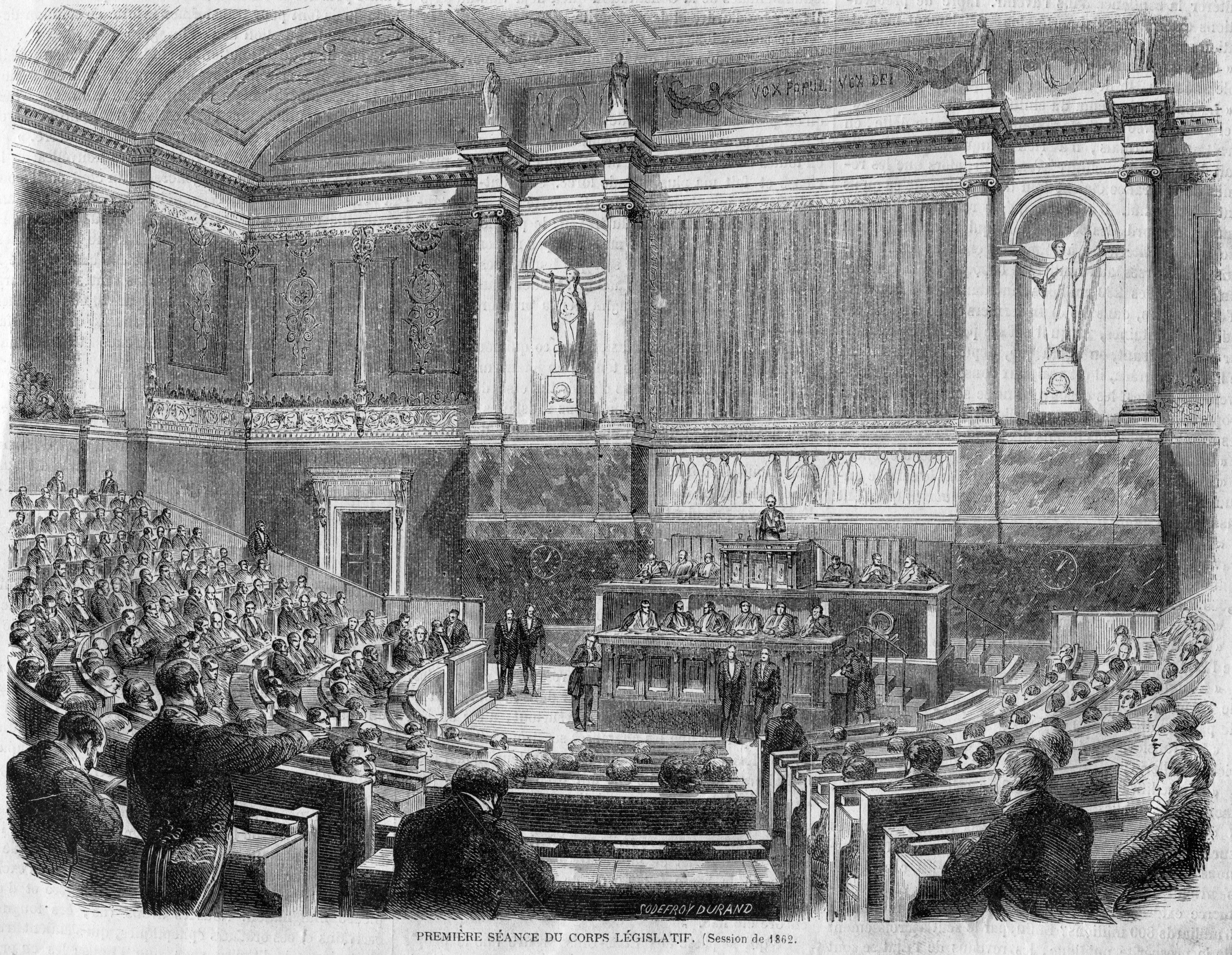
A meeting of the Corps Legislative in the Palais Bourbon in 1862

Following the revolution in February 1848, France and its legislature entered a turbulent period. The enormous painting of Louis Philippe taking his oath, hung over the tribune in the Chamber of Deputies, was taken down and replaced by a Gobelin tapestry of the painting of Raphael, The School of Athens, made between 1683 and 1688. The Chamber of Deputies elected in 1846 was abruptly disbanded by the revolution. A new election by direct universal suffrage chose a Constituent Assembly. The Constituent Assembly met for the first time in the temporary Chamber which had been constructed in the garden of the Palais Bourbon, and then, on 4 May, the French Second Republic was proclaimed at the palace. On May 15 a mob with red flags invaded the Chamber, demanding a much more radical government. Another unsuccessful attempt to seize the government was launched in June 1848. A new National Assembly was elected along with a new president, Charles-Louis Napoléon Bonaparte, the nephew of Napoleon, who had lived most of his life in exile. On 2 December 1851, when the Assembly refused to change the constitution to allow him to run for a second term, Louis Napoléon organised a coup d'état, took power, and had himself proclaimed Napoleon III, Emperor of the French, ending the Second Republic. Opposition deputies were arrested and exiled. The Assembly continued to meet in the Palais Bourbon, but had little influence. They were not allowed to speak from the Tribune but only from the floor of the Chamber.

After 1860, the regime was liberalised, giving the deputies greater influence; freedom of speech and press was reestablished, and debates resumed in the Palais Bourbon. On 31 May 1861 a musical and theatrical evening from the Bouffes-Parisiens company, which included the premiere of Offenbach's M. Choufleuri restera chez lui le . . ., was hosted. In 1870, the Assembly voted with patriotic enthusiasm for a war with Prussia, despite the opposition of a few deputies, including Adolphe Thiers. In a matter of weeks the French army was defeated, Louis Napoléon was captured, the Empire collapsed, and on 2–3 September the French Third Republic was founded.

=== The Third Republic (1871–1940) ===
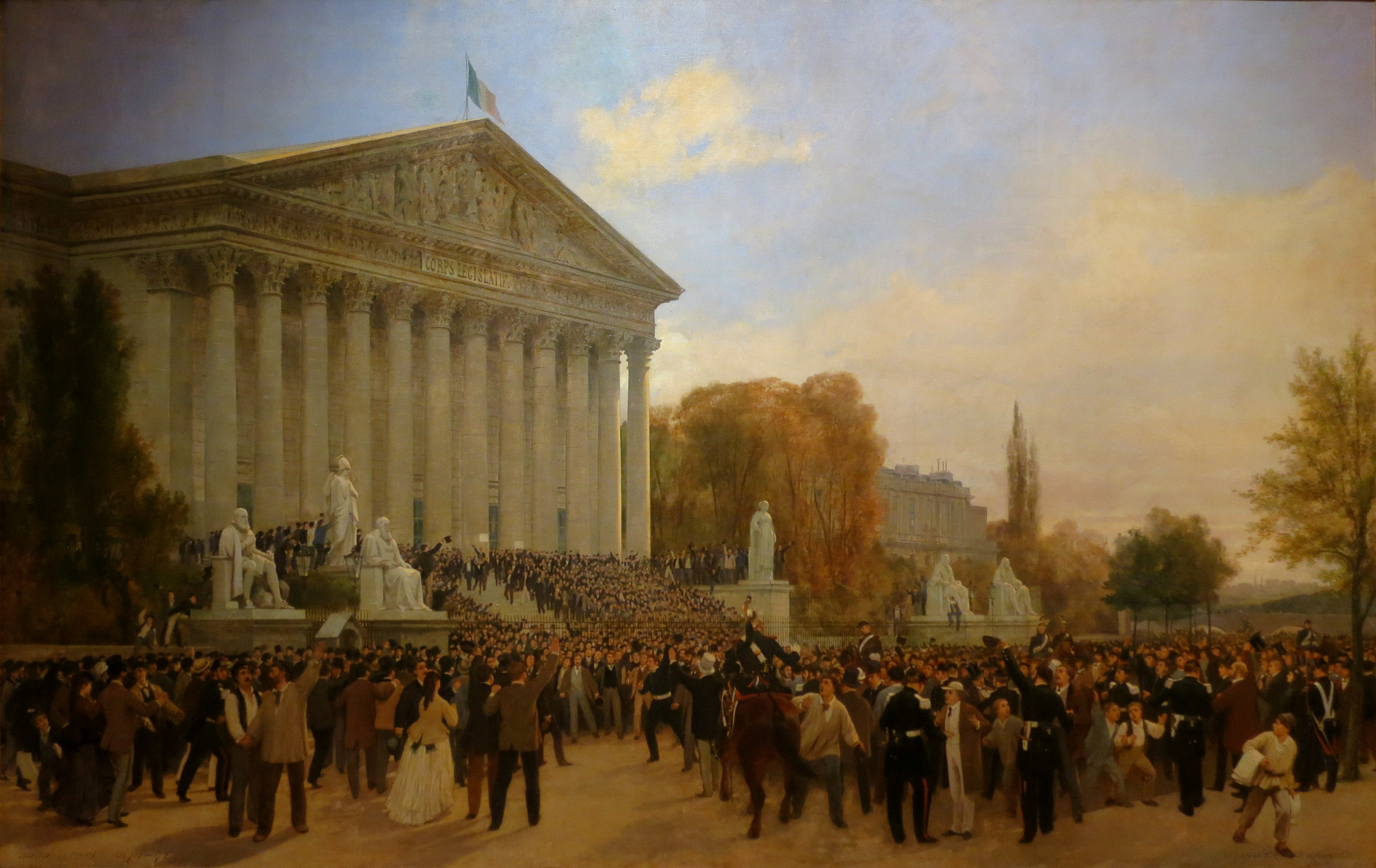
A crowd celebrates the proclamation of the Third Republic outside the Palais Bourbon (4 September 1870)

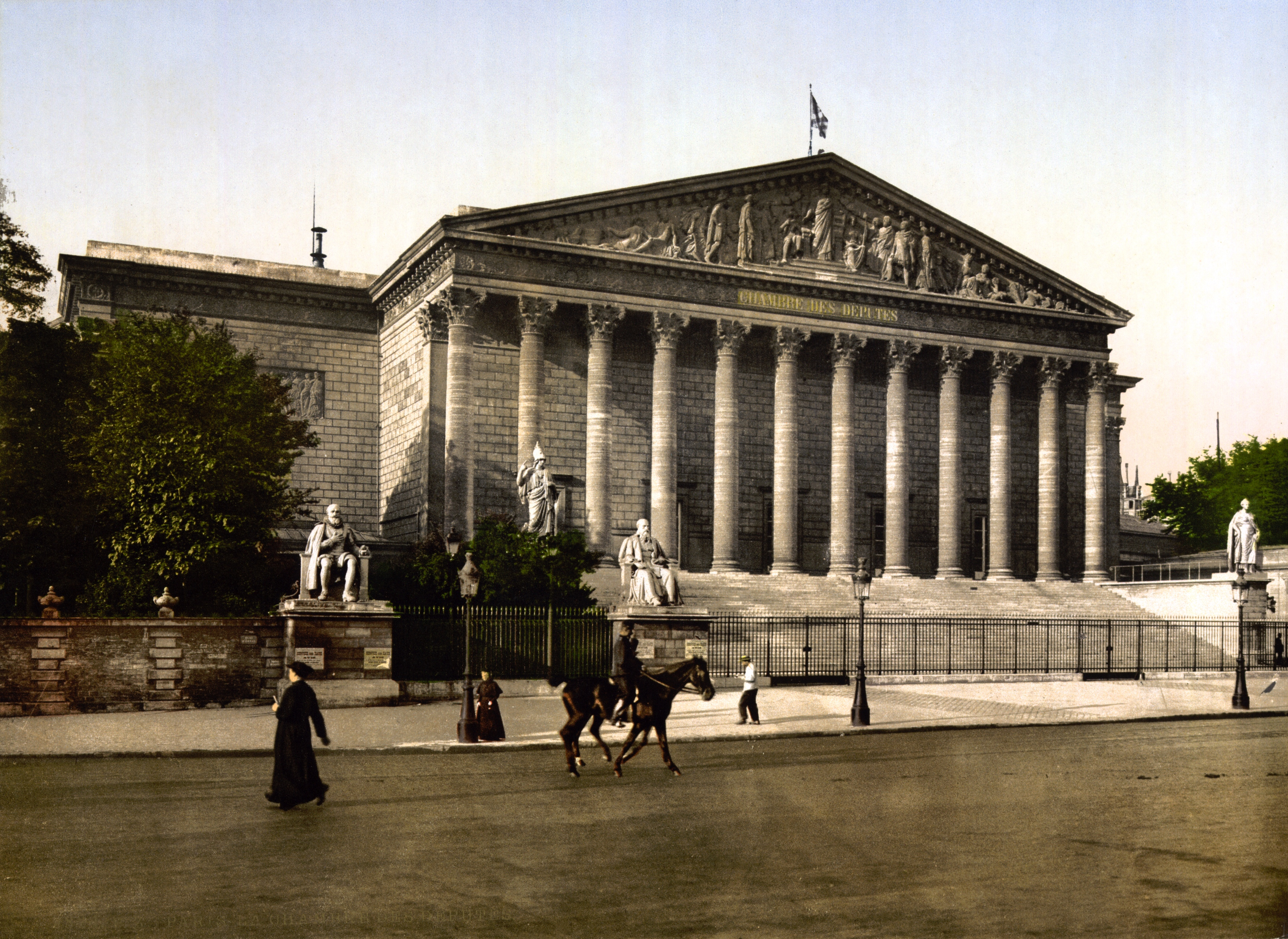
The Palais Bourbon in the 1890s

After the defeat at Sedan, A provisional government of Parliament leaders was formed, and tried to continue the war, but Paris was soon surrounded. The leader of the provisional government, Léon Gambetta, had to escape from Paris by balloon. The Palais Bourbon was abandoned; the Assembly moved first to Bordeaux and then to Versailles. The Paris Commune seized power in the city in March 1871, but in May was suppressed by the French Army. The Palais Bourbon escaped destruction, unlike the Tuileries Palace, Hôtel de Ville, the Palace of Justice, State Council, and other government buildings, which were set on fire in the last days of the Commune. While the French Senate returned to Paris soon after the suppression of the Commune, the Assembly remained in Versailles until 27 November 1879.

The new Assembly of the Third Republic was considerably larger than that of early governments, with 531 deputies, compared with 260 under the Second Empire. The new president of the Chamber, Léon Gambetta, called for a study and plan to enlarge the meeting space. A long series of enlargement plans were considered between 1879 and 1913, but none were ever approved.

During the Third Republic, the Palais Bourbon was the home of the primary institution of the French government. The Assembly selected the president of France and controlled finances and foreign policy. Its members were divided between constitutional monarchists and conservatives, who sat to the right of the Chamber as seen from the podium, and the moderate and radical republicans and later socialists, who sat to the left. The Chamber saw many eloquent and spirited debates between the leaders of the parties, and sometimes turmoil. In 1898, during the Dreyfus affair, the socialist leader Jean Jaurès was struck by a monarchist deputy while giving a speech in the Chamber, and a bomb placed by an anarchist exploded in the gallery in 1890. The Assembly declared war in 1914 and celebrated victory in 1918, but was badly divided in the 1930s and was unable to manage the economic crisis and the approach of World War II.

=== World War II and Fourth and Fifth Republics ===
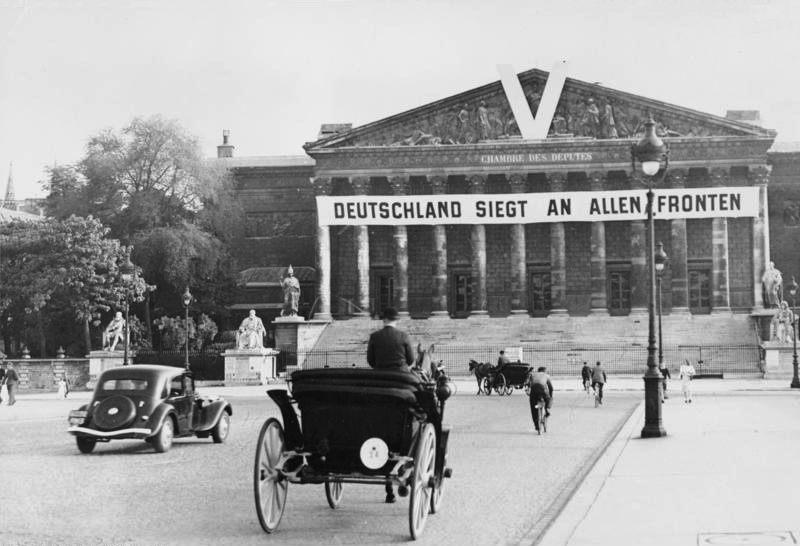
A German victory banner on the Palais Bourbon in July 1941. It reads 'Germany is victorious on all fronts'.

In June 1940, as the Nazis approached the capital, the government fled Paris and moved first to Tours; then to Bordeaux; and then, under the Pétain government, to Vichy. The Germans used the Palais Bourbon as the military court for the Luftwaffe, and it also housed the offices of the French bureau which sent French workers to factories in Germany. German propaganda banners decorated the Seine façade of the palace. During the liberation of Paris in August 1944, parts of the palace were badly damaged. A fire in the library started by the fighting destroyed twenty thousand books. Philippe de Gaulle, the son of Charles de Gaulle, was sent from Montparnasse Station on 25 August 1944 with orders for the Germans troops entrenched within National Assembly at the Palais Bourbon to surrender. Despite being unarmed and the risk of being killed, he negotiated their surrender.

The Fourth Republic was founded by the adoption of a new constitution in 1946 and brought new technology to the Palais Bourbon, including the first microphones for speakers, but featured a large number of political parties and unstable coalitions which frequently collapsed. The Algerian Crisis of 1956 brought an end to the Fourth Republic, the approval of a new constitution, and the adoption of the still-existing Fifth Republic.

== Today ==
=== The Cour d'Honneur ===
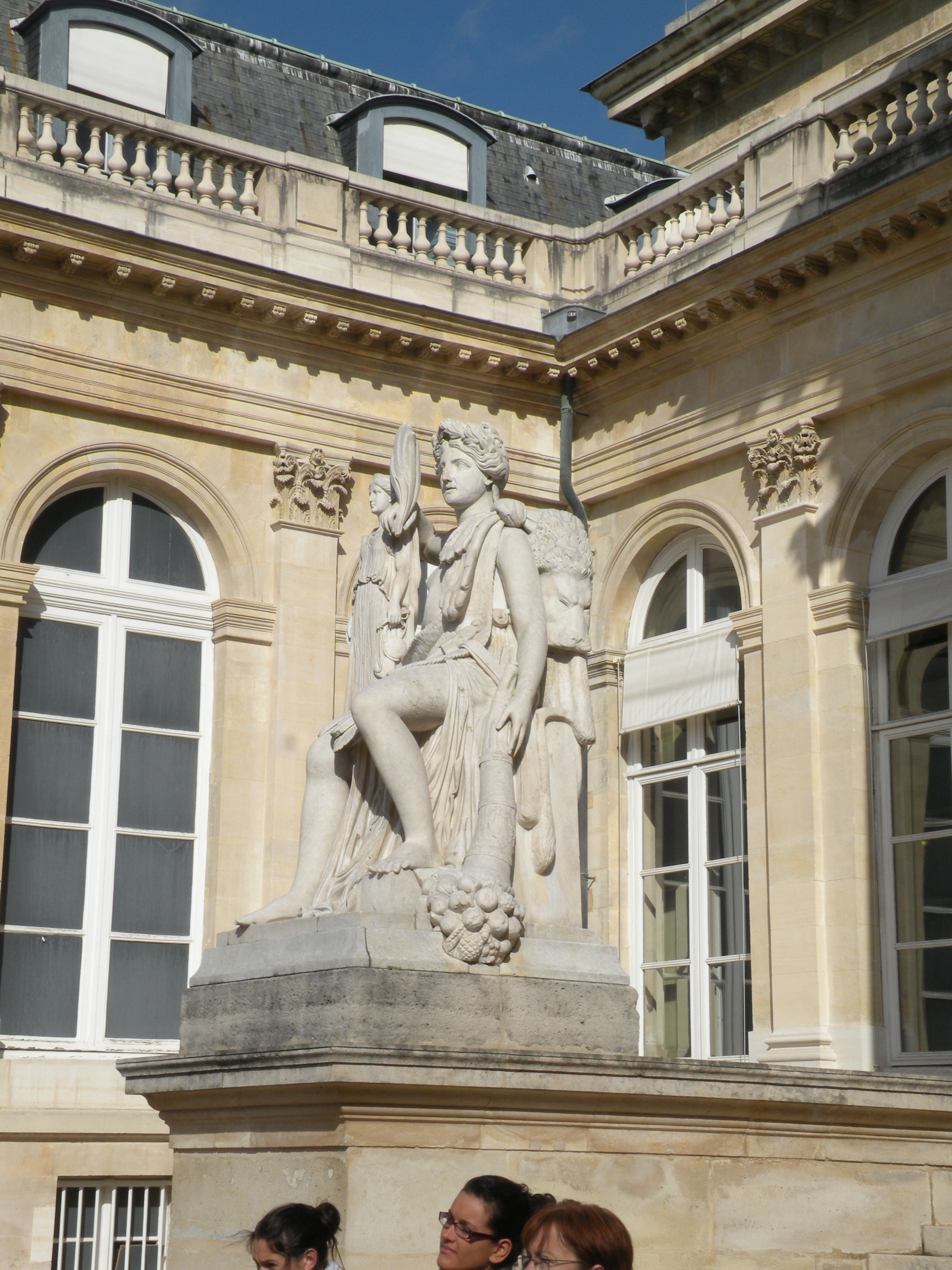
Statue of Universal Suffrage by Gayrard (1860)

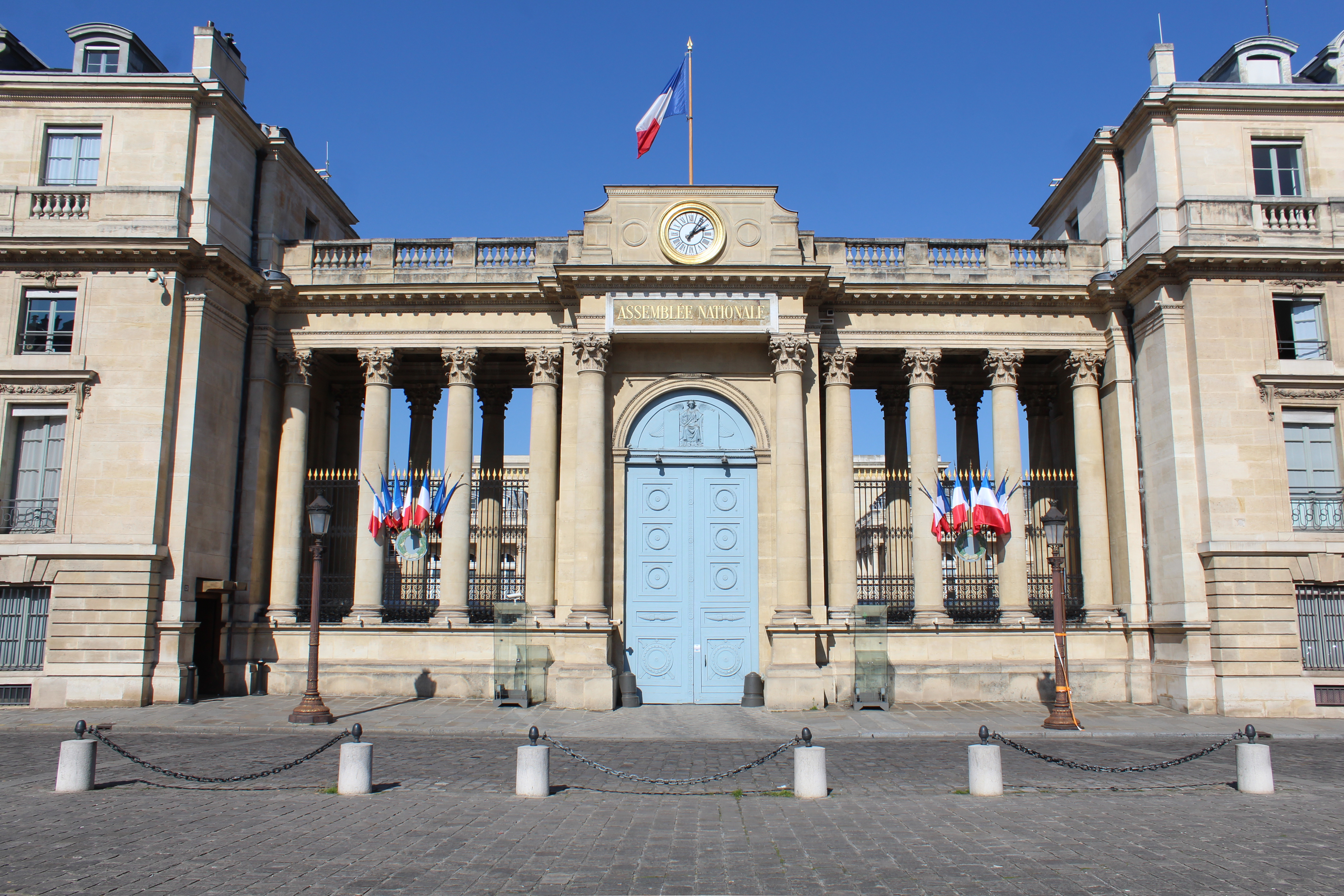
The gateway to the Cour d'Honneur from the Rue de l'Université

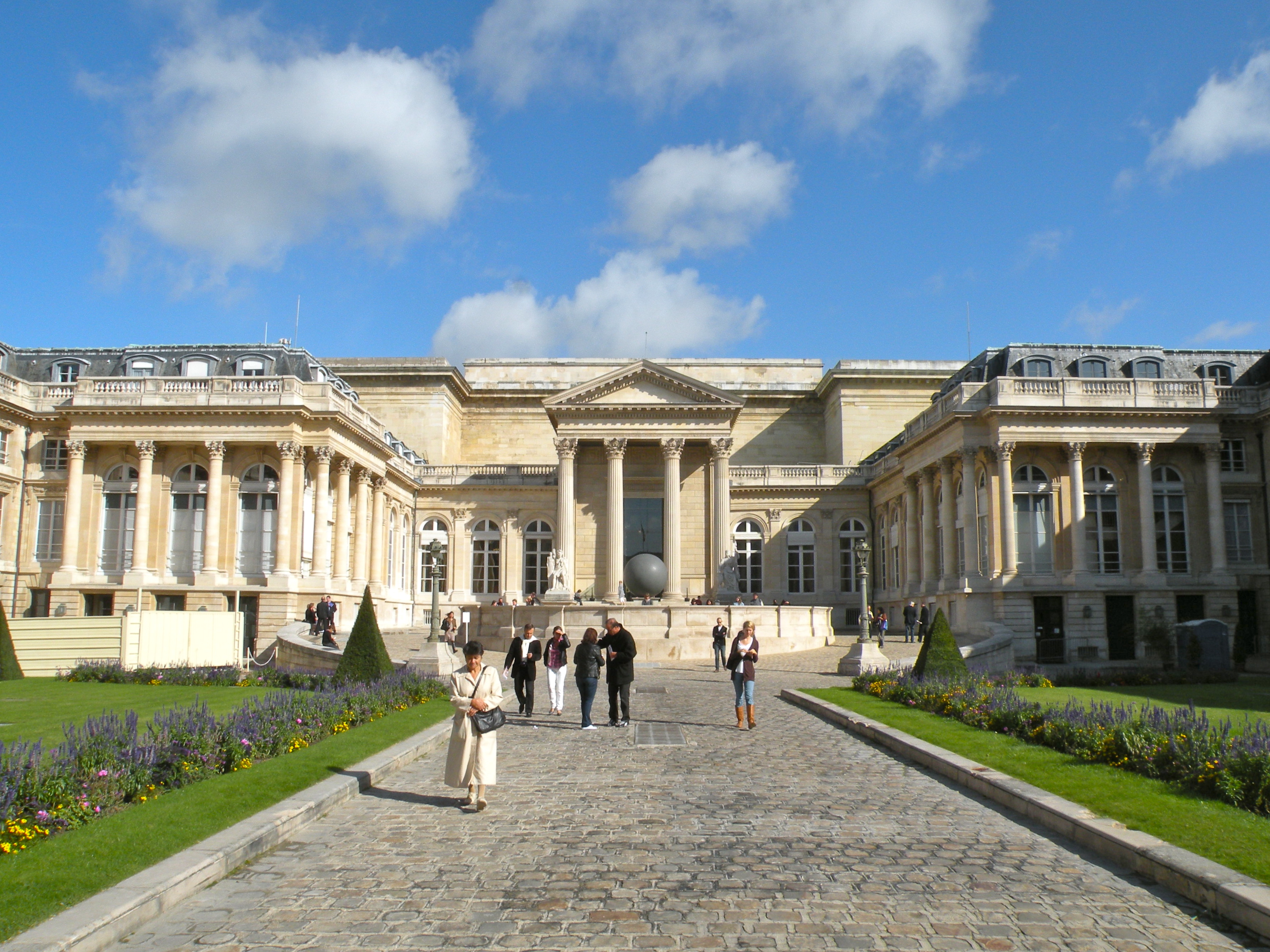
The Cour d'Honneur

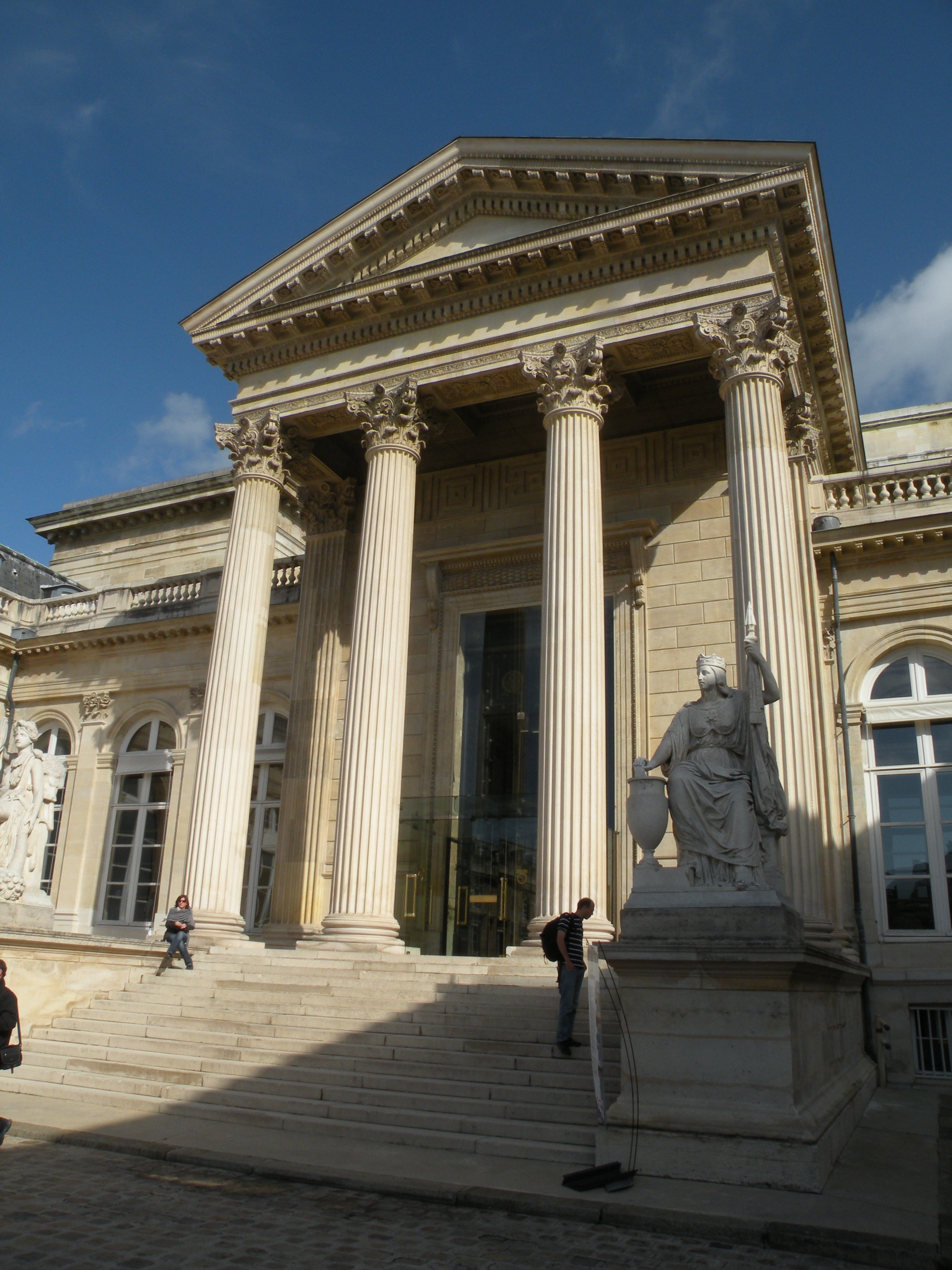
The portico of the ceremonial entrance of the palace

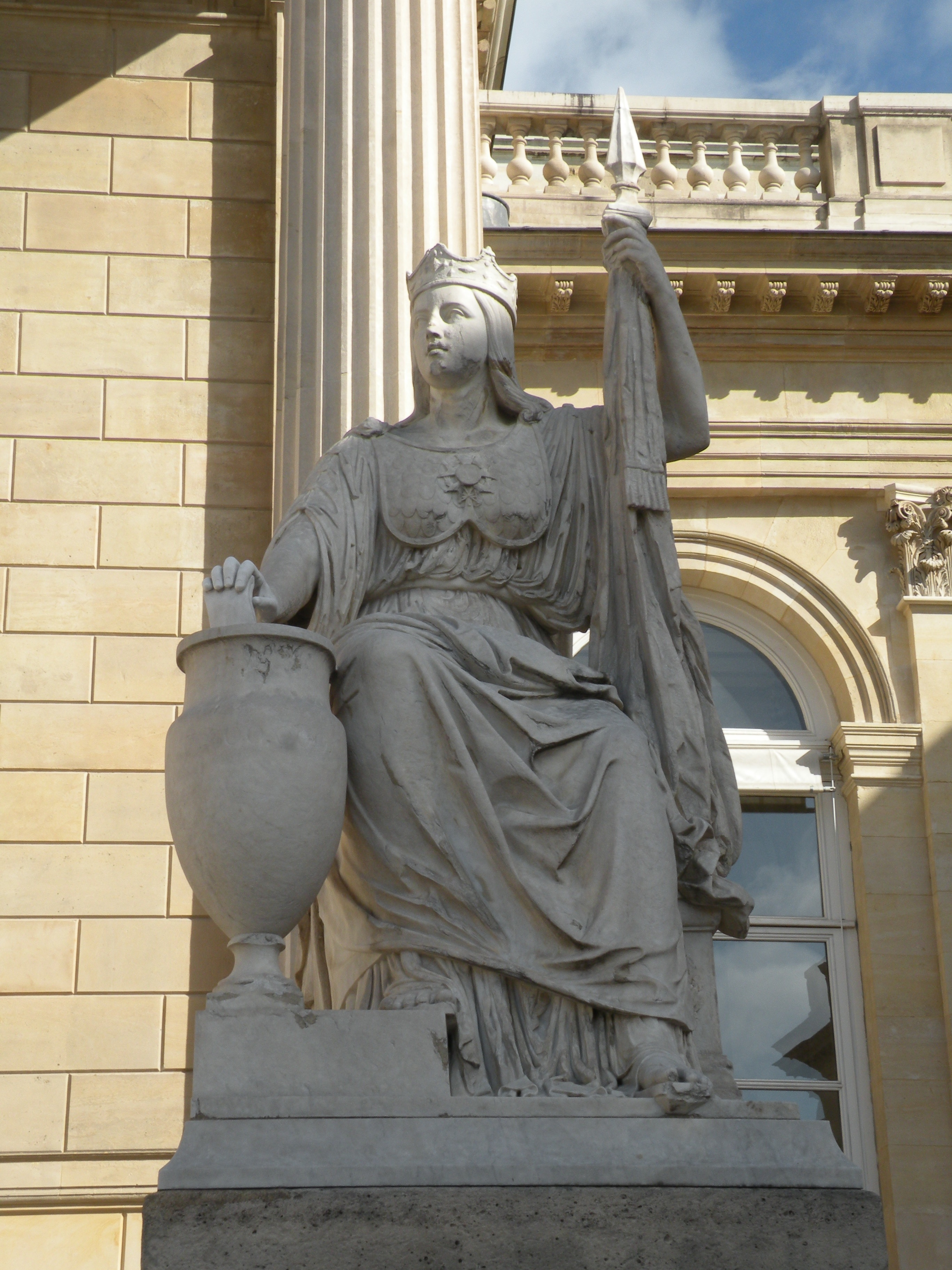
Statue of The Law by Gayrard (1860)

The Cour d'Honneur, to the south of the palace, has been the main entrance since the original palace was constructed. It was considerably modified in the 1830s, with the addition of the ceremonial portico over the doorway, but still retains its original outlines. The sculptures on either side of the entrance, representing Universal Suffrage and the Law, were added during the Second Empire in 1860. The granite ball on a pedestal in the centre of the courtyard, called the Sphere of Human Rights, is by the American sculptor Walter De Maria. It was added in 1989 to commemorate the bicentennial of the French Revolution.

=== Meeting Chamber ===
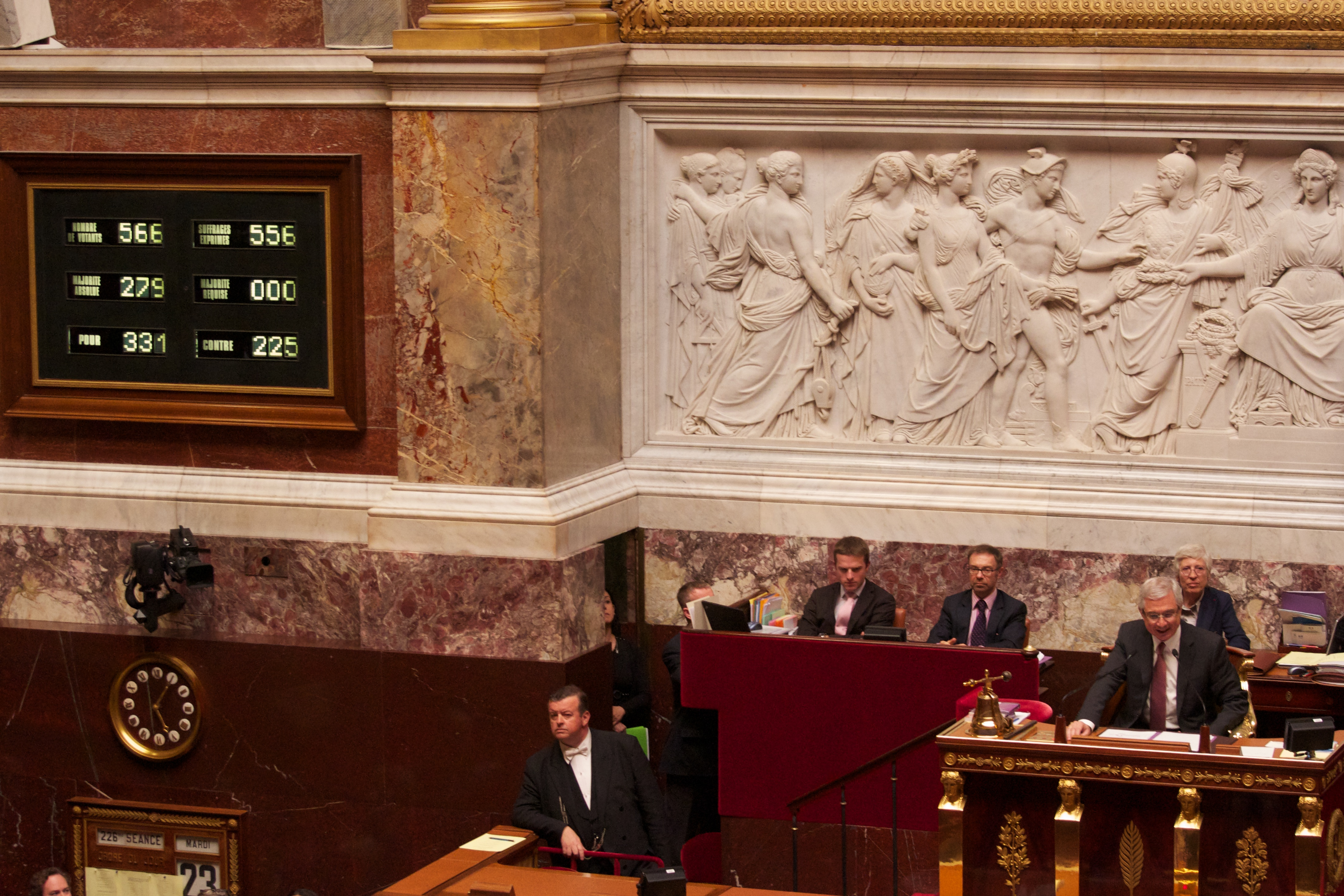
Votes are registered electronically and shown on a board next to the tribune. This is the vote approving same-sex marriage in 2013.

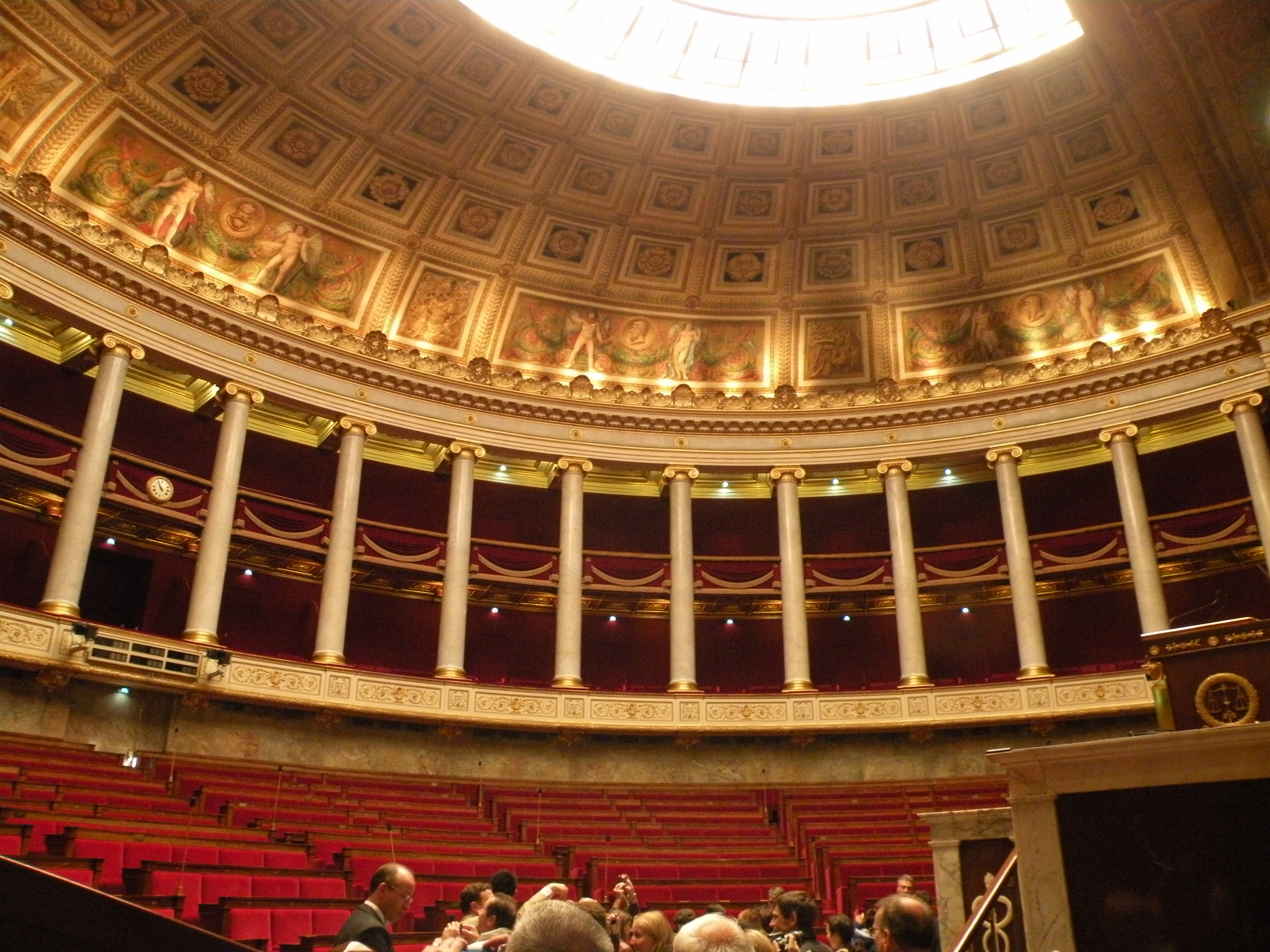
Galleries for the public

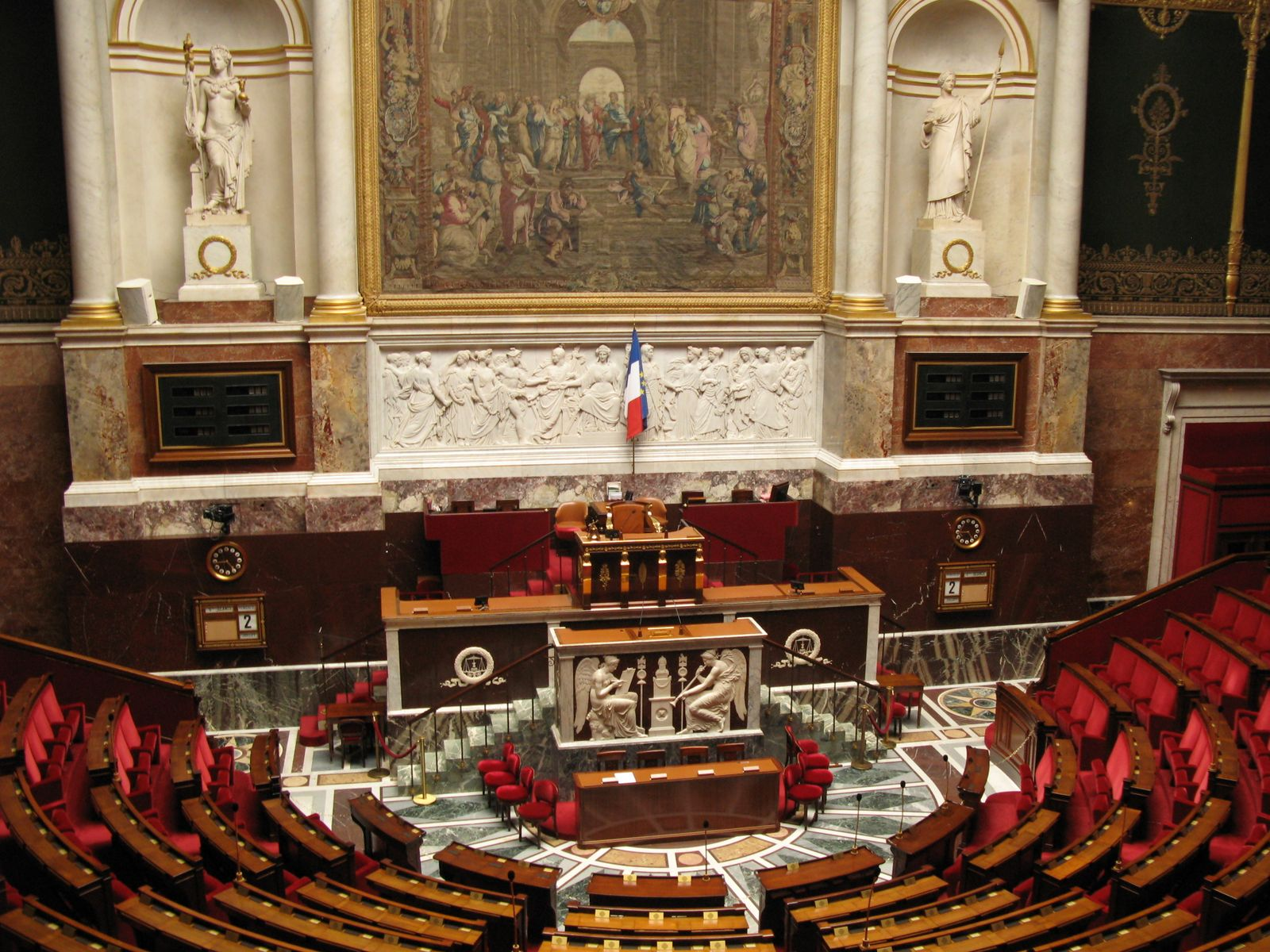
The tribune and desk of the president

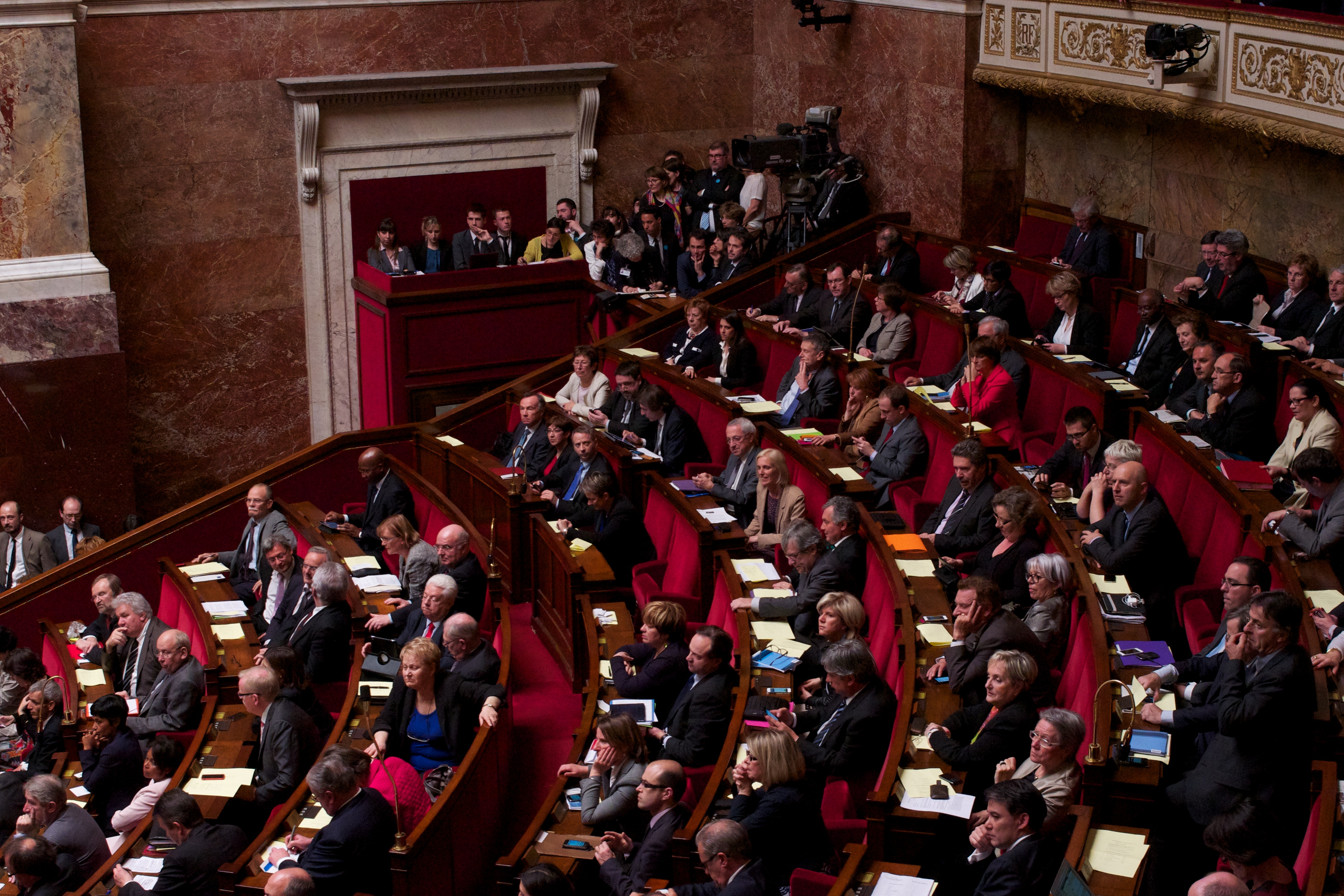
The Assembly in session, 2013.

The Salle des Séances, or meeting Chamber of the Palais Bourbon, has the same basic appearance and arrangement as it did in 1832. Per the constitution, the Assembly is in session for nine months, from the beginning of October until the end of June, but the deputies can be summoned at any time for a special session by the president of the French Republic. The 577 deputies, elected for five-year terms, are seated in the hemicycle, with the deputies of the socialists and other parties of the left seated to the left of the speaker, and those of the more conservative parties to the right. The president of the Assembly is seated in the perchoir, or perch, a desk high up against the wall of the Chamber, at the height of the highest back row, symbolising that the president is a deputy like the others. The armchair was designed by Jacques-Louis David for the Council of Five Hundred, the first legislature to meet in the building.

Deputies vote electronically by pushing a button, and the count is displayed at the front of the Chamber. The sessions of the Chamber are open to the public though access must be requested through the office of a deputy. The sessions are also transmitted live on the Internet site of the Assembly.

=== Salons ===
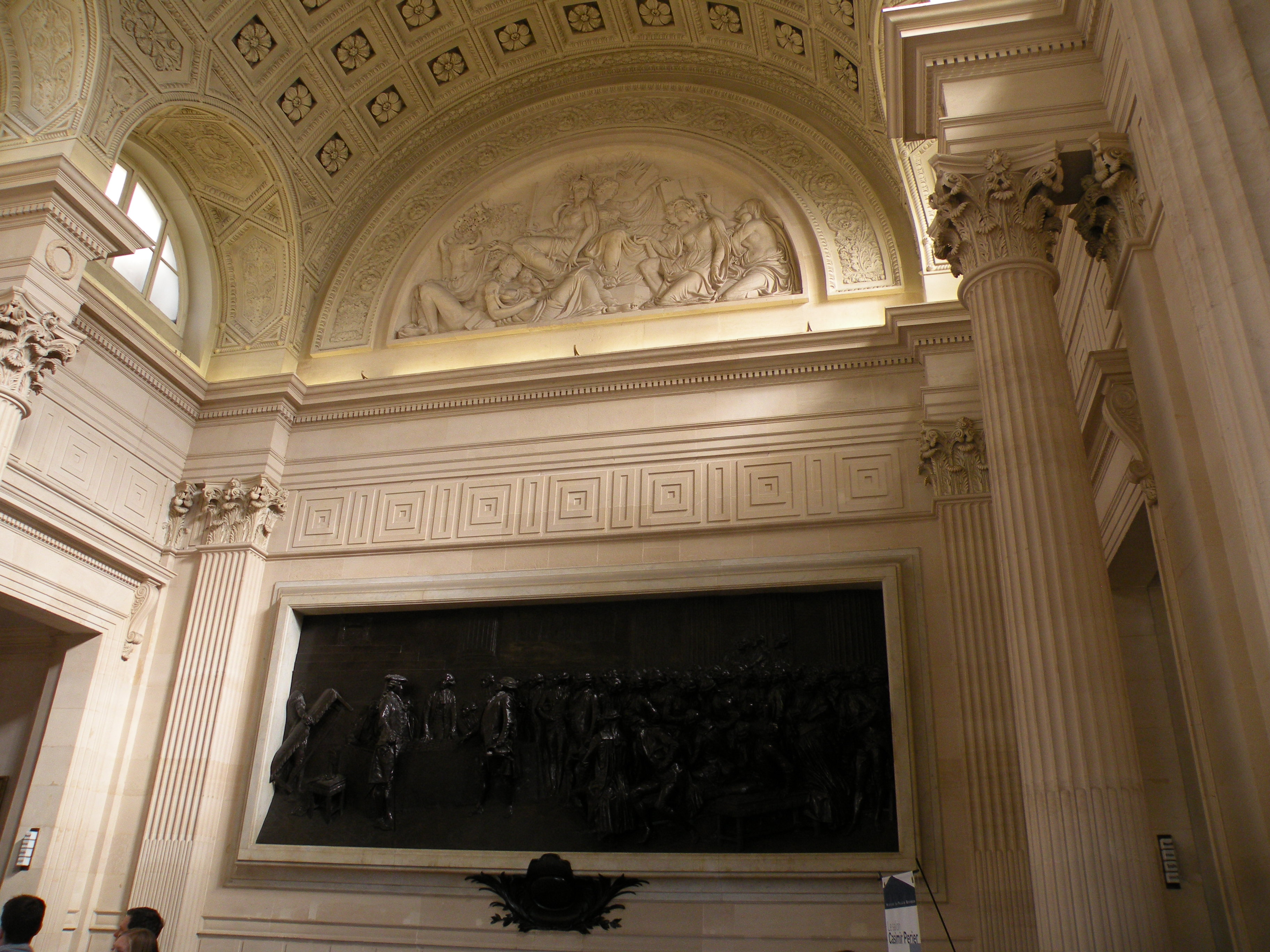
The Salle Casimir-Périer, with a bronze bas-relief of the 1798 Assembly by Jules Dalou

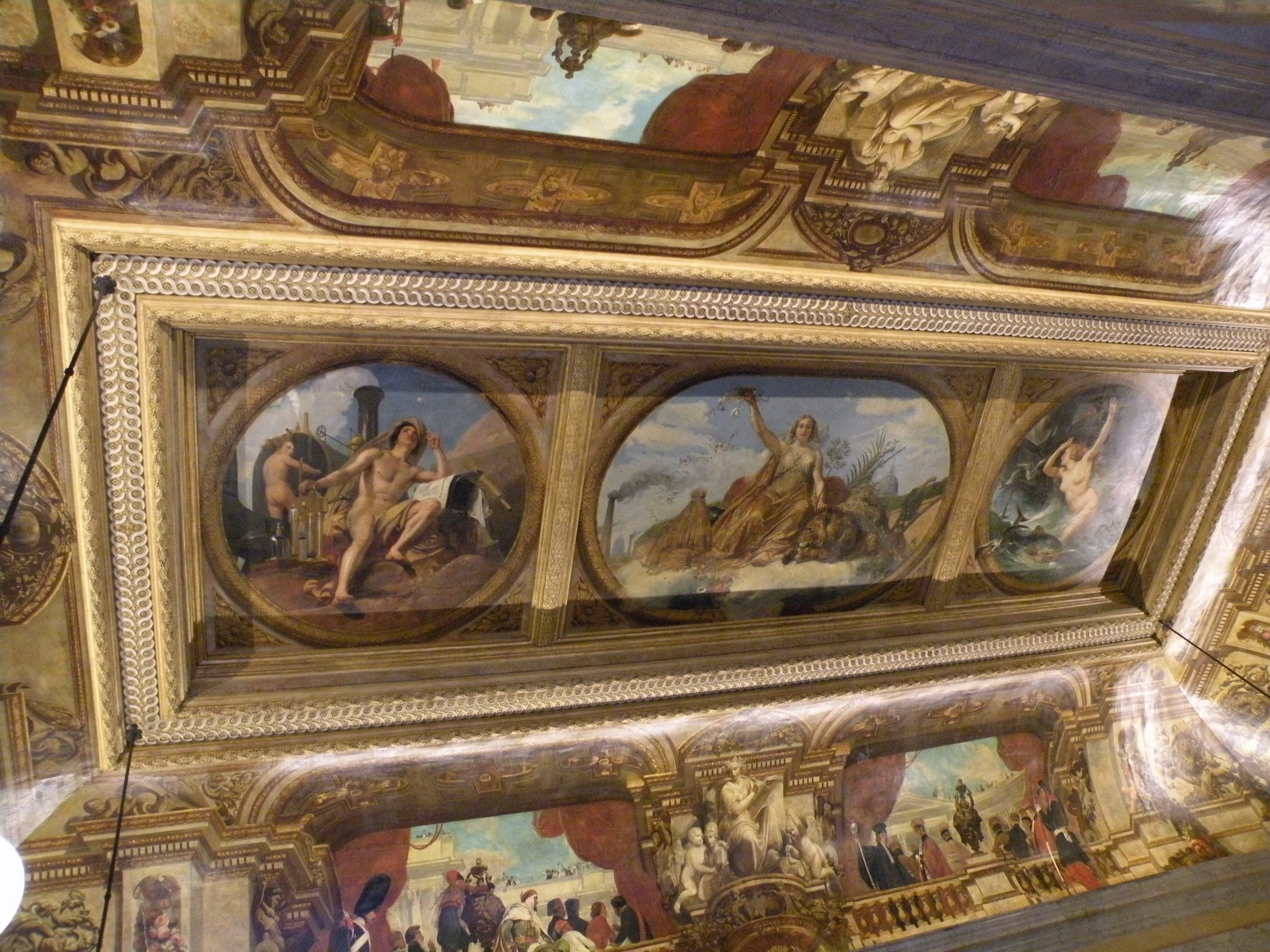
The ceiling of the Salle des Pas Perdus, showing Vernet's Genius of Steam, Peace distributes her benefits, and Steam chasing the gods of the Sea

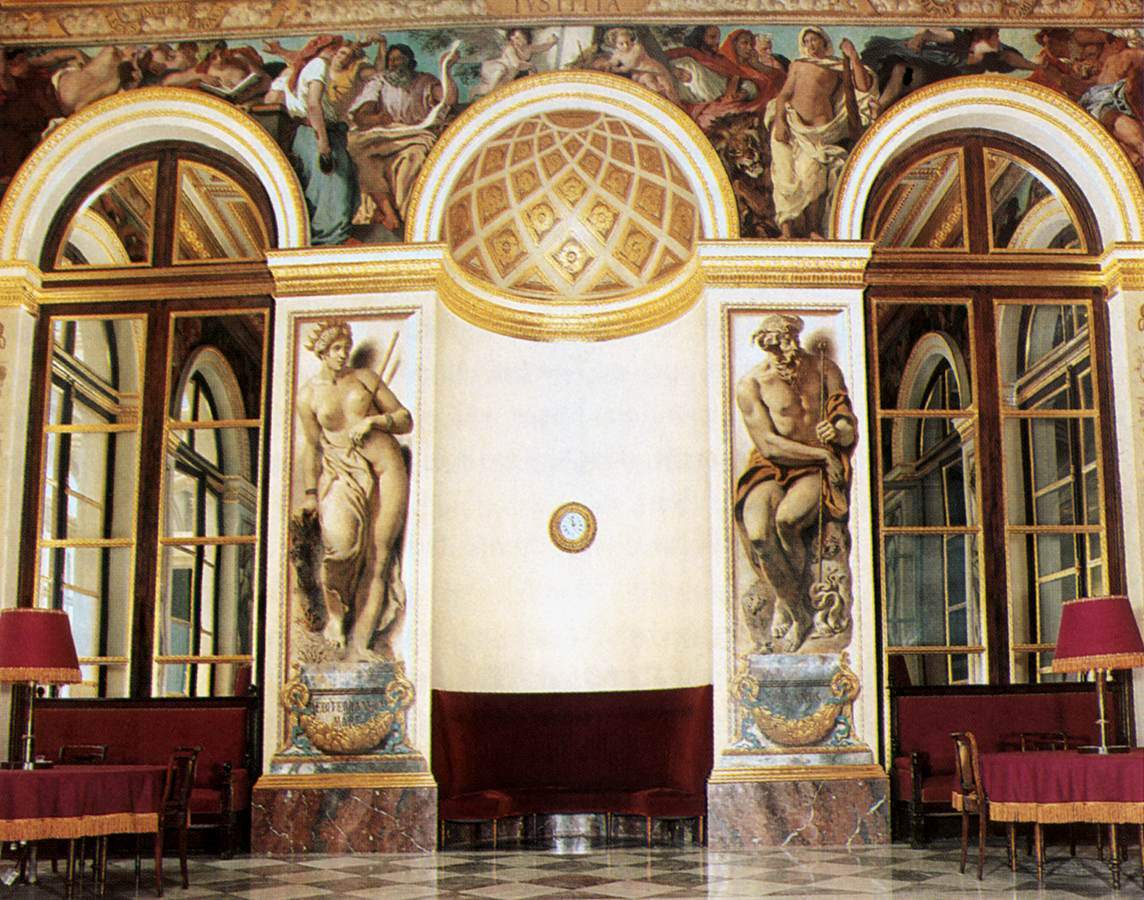
The west wall of the Salon Delacroix

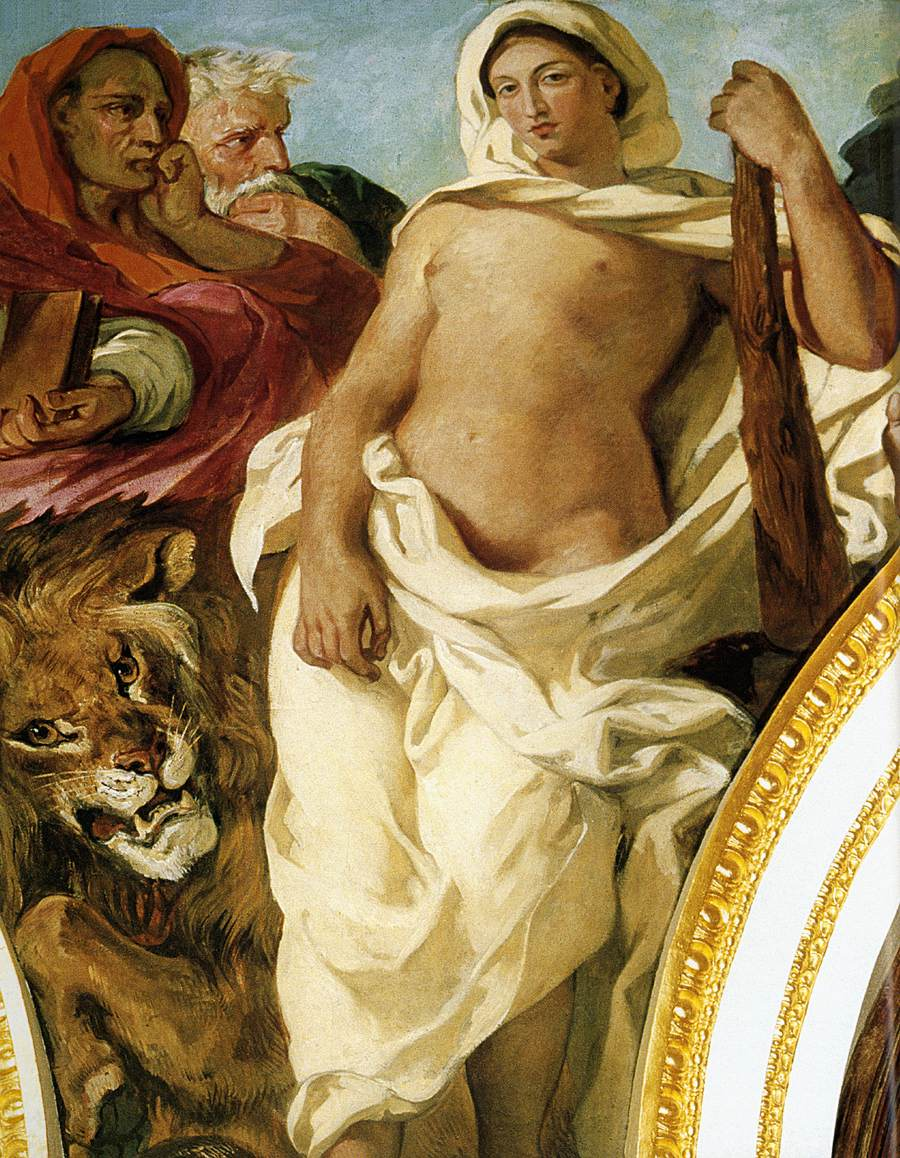
Illustration of Justice from the Salon Delacroix

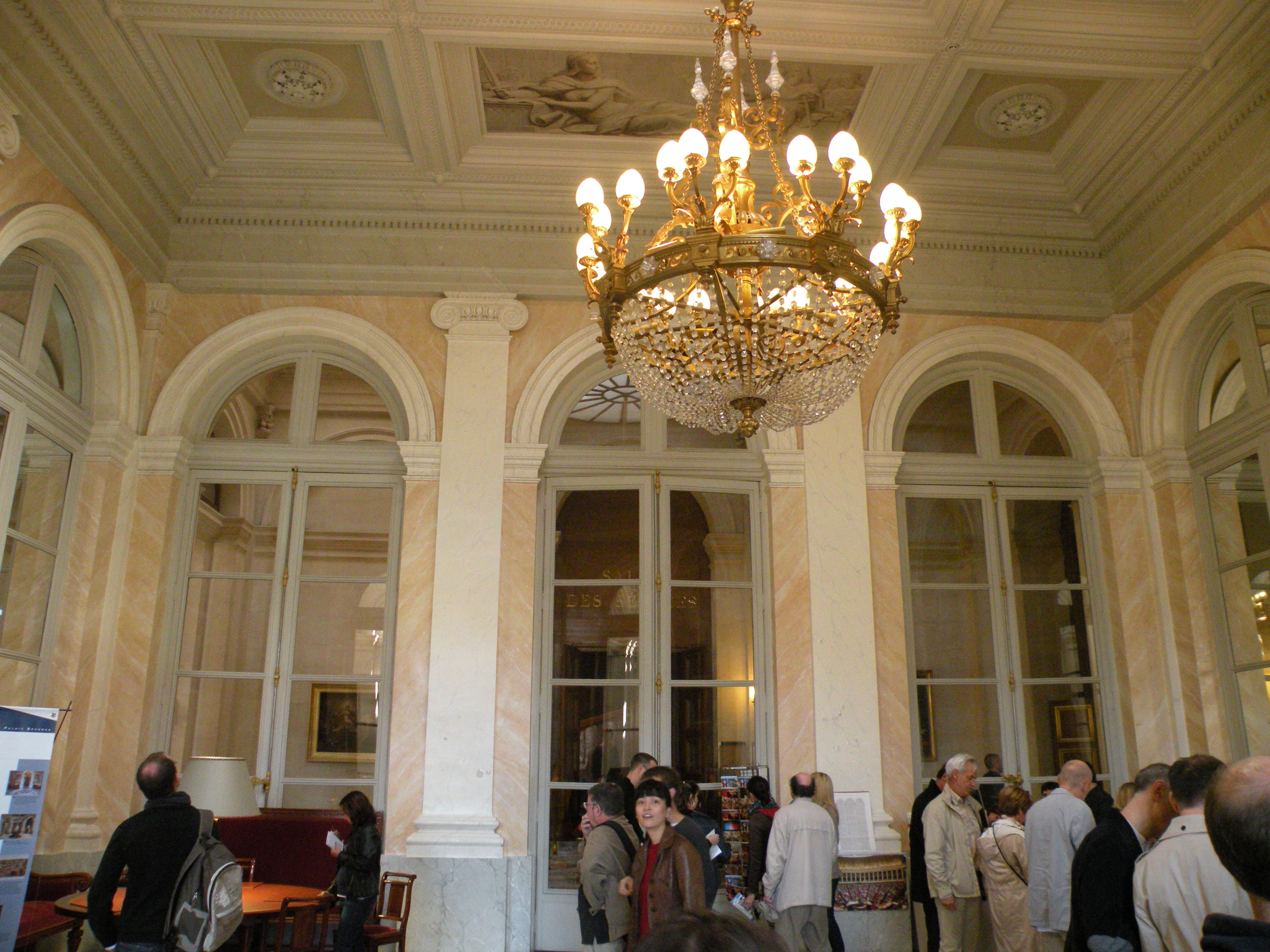
The Salon Abel de Pujol, with Neoclassic grisaille paintings of famous French rulers on the ceiling

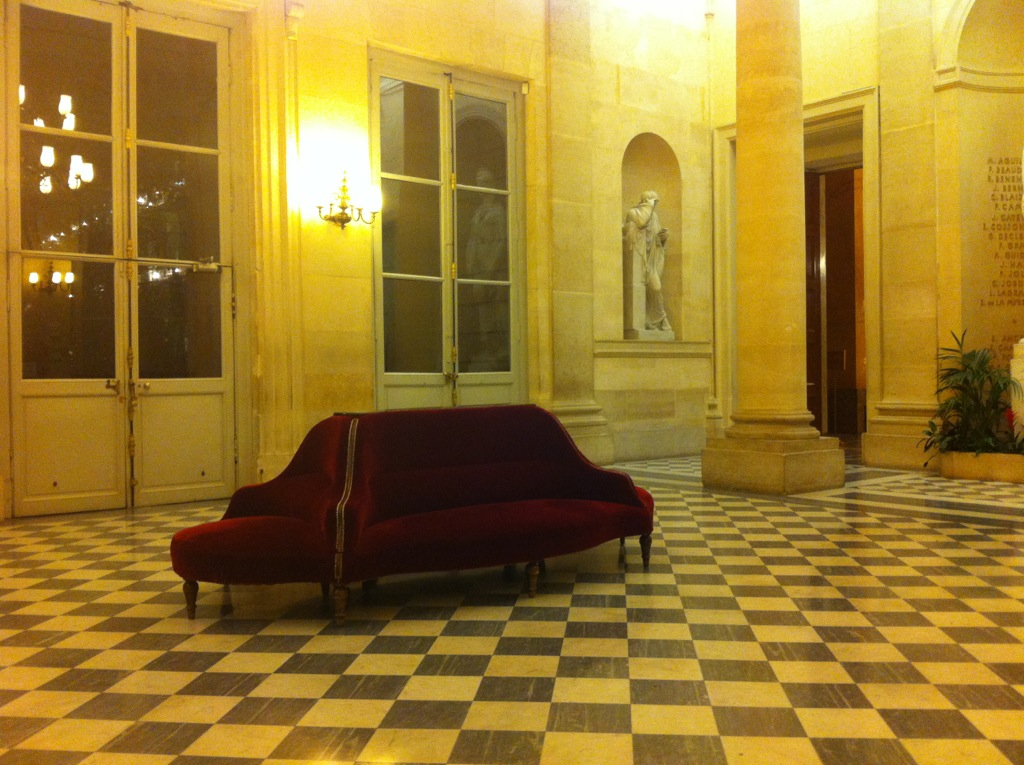
The Salon des Quatre Colonnes

The salons of the Palais Bourbon were created during the reign of Louis Philippe and were decorated by prominent artists, most notably Eugène Delacroix:

- The Salle Casimir-Périer is a wide corridor with a vaulted ceiling which connects the Assembly Chamber with the salons and with the courtyard. The architecture is inspired by that of ancient Rome. Its primary decoration is a massive bronze bas-relief depicting the first meetings of the Assembly during the French Revolution, by sculptor Jules Dalou. It was originally designed for a monument to the Revolution that was never constructed and was then, at the request of Assembly president Léon Gambetta, cast in bronze for the Palais Bourbon. It weighs four tons. The hall also includes six statues of illustrious members of the Assembly by different themes: statues of Mirabeau and Maximilien Sébastien Foy representing resistance to absolute governments; statues of Jean Sylvain Bailly and Casimir-Périer representing resistance to popular sedition; and statues celebrating the authors of the French Civil Code, Jean-Étienne-Marie Portalis and François Denis Tronchet. The decoration also includes bas-reliefs under the ceiling at either end representing Law as the protector and Law avenging injustice. The lunettes illuminating the hall also have sculptural decoration, representing Meditation, Justice, Peace, Work, Industry, Commerce, Force, War, Maritime commerce, and Agriculture. This hall is the place in which members of the government gather before they go into the Chamber on Tuesdays and Wednesdays, when they answer questions from the deputies.
- The Salon Delacroix was decorated by Delacroix beginning when the artist was just twenty-five years old. It was originally called the Salon de Roi and was meant as a place in which Louis Philippe could meet with the deputies when he came to the Chamber. The work was completed in 1836. The dominant elements of the decoration are four allegorical figures, which, according to Delacroix, symbolised 'the living forces of the State; Justice, Agriculture, Industry, and War'. Two grisaille allegorical paintings of the Ocean and the Mediterranean decorate the west wall. The niche between these paintings originally held the throne used by Louis Philippe during his visits to the Palais Bourbon. The salon is now used as a gathering place for deputies of the left, whose seats are just inside, and informal parliamentary negotiations often take place here.
- The Salle des Pas Perdus originally contained a bedroom and baths in the residence of the Duchess. It was transformed into a formal hall under Louis Philippe, was decorated with paintings by Horace Vernet and Charles Séchan, and was finished in 1839. The centrepiece of the decoration by Vernet is the painting Peace distributes her benefits, flanked by The Genius of steam, representing a steam railroad locomotive, newly introduced to France; and the Genius of Steam chasing the gods of the Sea, featuring a steamship. Following a tradition begun under Louis Phillipe, the president of the Assembly walks through the room on his way from the Hôtel de Lassay to the afternoon session in the hemicycle. When he arrives in the room, drums sound, and he walks through two ranks of Republican Guards with swords who salute his passage.
- The Salon Abel de Pujol was created in 1838–1840 under Louis Philippe. It takes its name from the artist Abel de Pujol who painted the grisailles on the ceiling, which illustrate the role of French monarchs in the establishment of law; Clovis I, the author of the first French laws; Charlemagne; Louis IX (Saint Louis); and Louis Philippe himself, by the Charter of 1830, which established his government. Today, the Salon is used especially as a gathering place for deputies of the right during sessions of the Assembly, where they negotiate last-minute changes and tactics.
- The Salon des Quatre Colonnes is decorated with several works of sculpture which originally stood in the Chamber of the Council of Five Hundred in 1798, and were removed during the works of 1832; statues of ancient legislators; Brutus, Lycurgus, Solomon, and Cato. On either side of the doorway to the Assembly Chamber are busts of two famous deputies symbolising the right and the left; the Christian Democrat Albert de Mun and the socialist Jean Jaurès. A marble monument shows the names of deputies killed in the First World War, and a statue of the Republic commemorates the deputies and Assembly officers who died in the Second World War. The room is used during Assembly sessions for stand-up television interviews with deputies.

=== Library ===
Delacroix's image of Orpheus bringing the benefits of art and civilisation to mankind

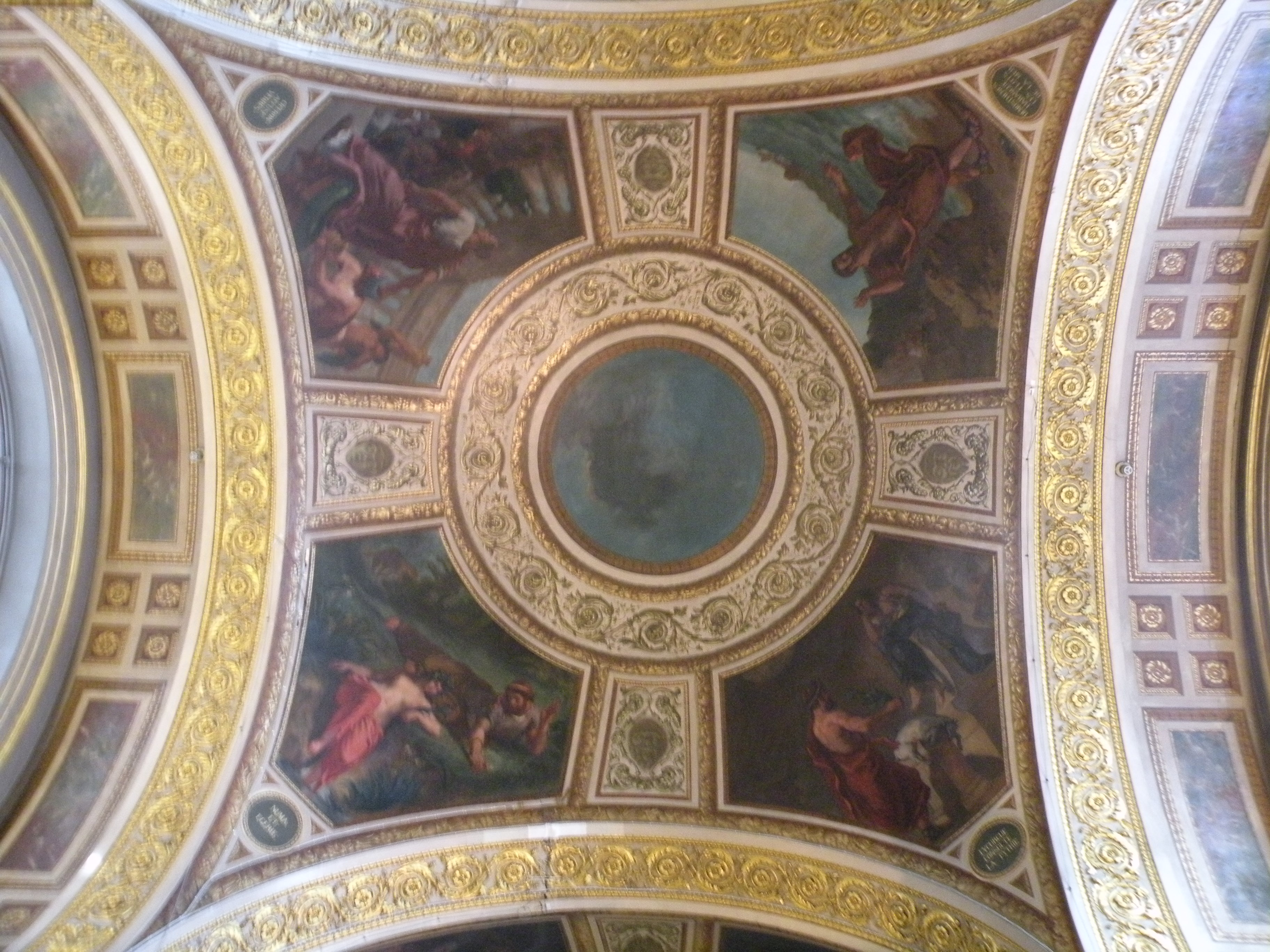
The central cupola, surrounded by allegorical figures

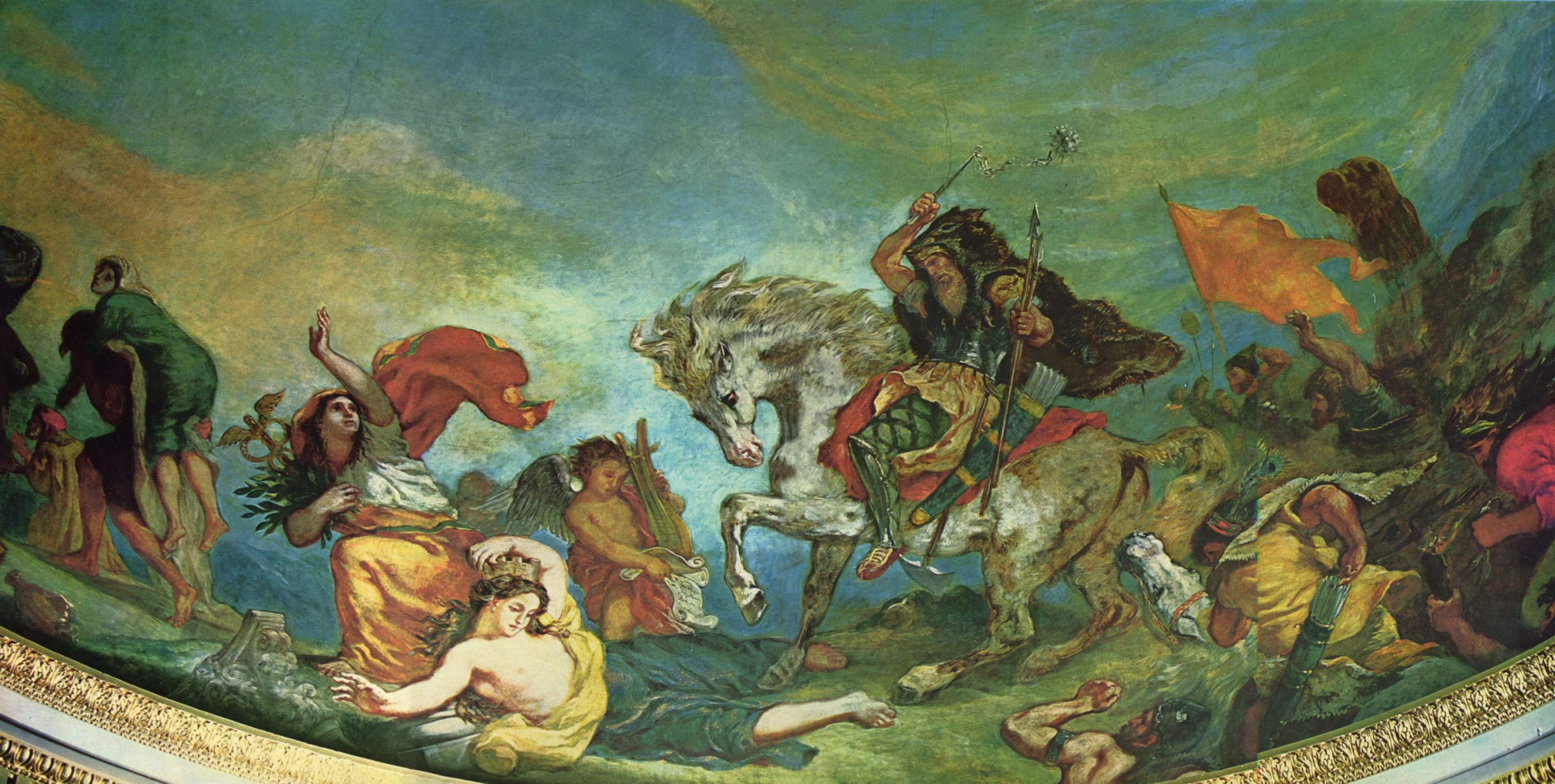
Delacroix's image of Attila attacking western civilisation

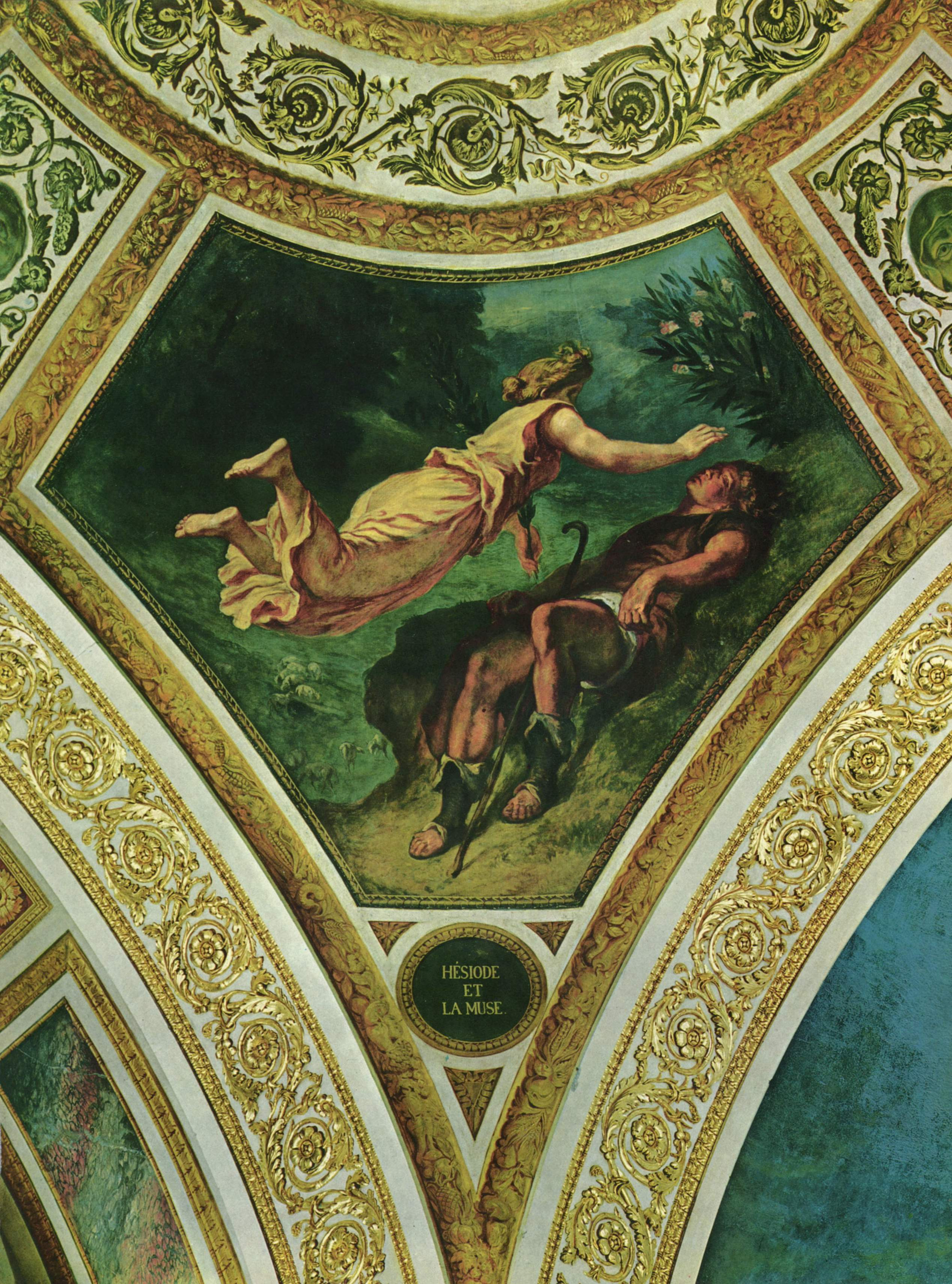
Hesiod and the Muse, representing poetry and science

The central aisle of the Library

The Library was built beginning in 1830 against the side of the original palace. The design is from architect Jules de Joly, in the style of the ancient Roman baths, with pillars supporting five cupolas, which provide light. It is closed at either end by curved bays. The decoration, by Eugène Delacroix and a team of assistants, was done between 1838 and 1847. The paintings on the ceiling around each of the cupolas represents a different branch of human knowledge; poetry, theology, legislation, philosophy, and the sciences. The stories that illustrate the themes were taken from antiquity, rather than from French history. They represent the great thinkers Ovid, Demosthenes, Herodotus, and Aristotle, as well as scenes representing the dangers to democracy and civilisation; the death of Saint John the Baptist, the death of Seneca the Younger, and the murder of Archimedes by a Roman soldier. The large paintings on the bays at either end of the room represent Orpheus bringing the benefits of the arts and civilization and Attila and his barbarian hordes at the feet of Italy and the Arts.

The original collection of the library was assembled from books confiscated from the libraries of the clergy and aristocracy who left Paris during the Revolution. It also includes many rare items donated to the Assembly, including the minutes of the trial of Joan of Arc, the manuscripts of Jean-Jacques Rousseau, donated by his widow in 1794, and the Codex Borbonicus, an Aztec codex written by Aztec priests shortly before or after the Spanish conquest of the Aztec Empire. The library is reserved for the use of the members of the Assembly and their staff. It's not open to the public.

=== Salle des Conférences and Buffet ===
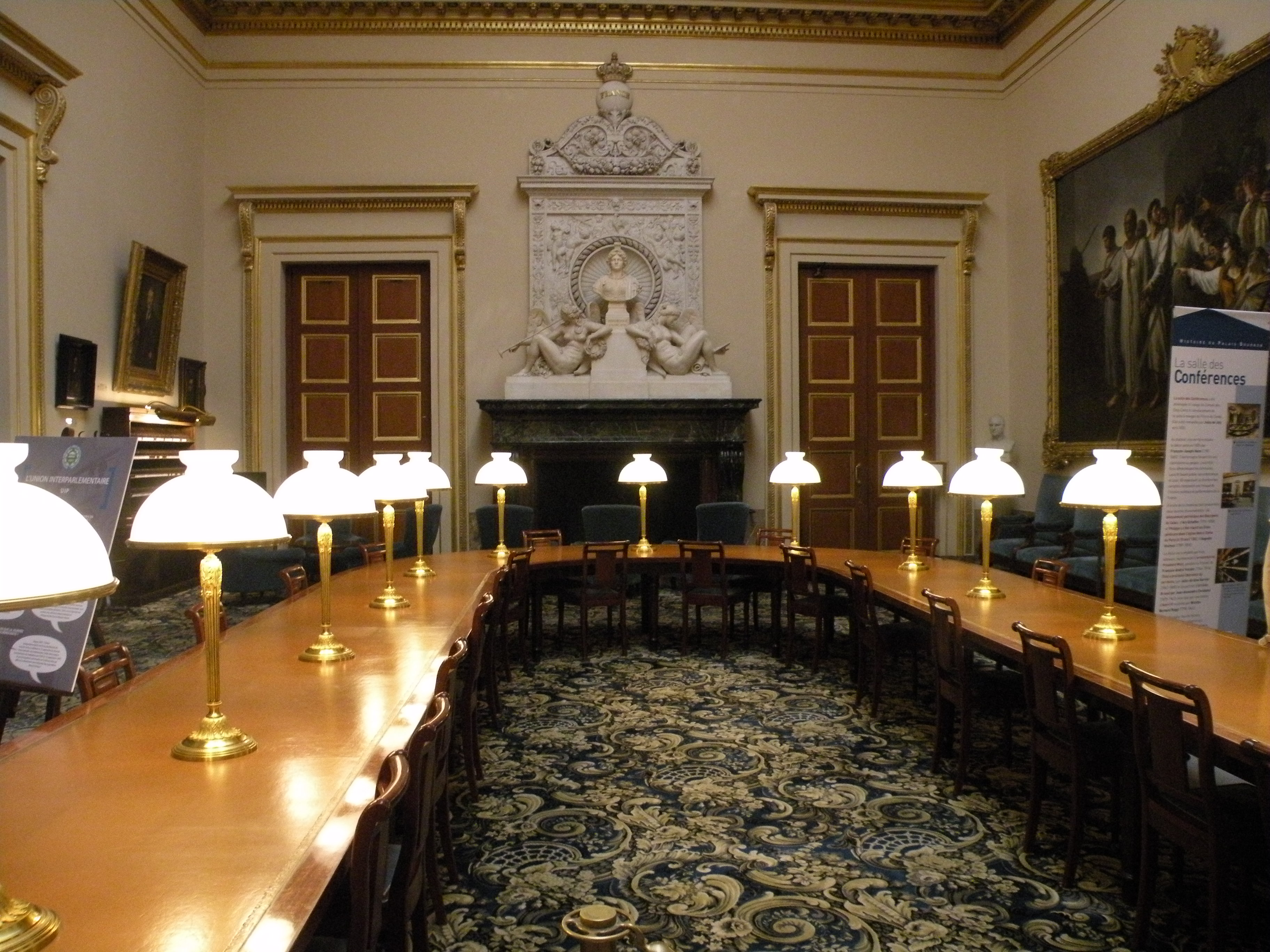
Salle des Conférences

The Salle des Conférences is a large room with tables and lamps on the east side of the hemicycle, where the deputies can read, talk, and check their messages. It was originally the dining room of the Prince de Condé and was transformed in 1830 into its present use. The ceiling is richly decorated with paintings by Heim on the history of the monarchy and parliaments; by the fireplace are large historical paintings on parliamentary subjects; such as The Patriotic Devotion of the Bourgeois of Calais by Ary Scheffer.

Next to the Salle des Conférences is the Buffet, which was created in 1994 in the Belle Époque style and renovated in the same style in 1997. It is reserved exclusively for the use of current and former deputies.

=== Hôtel de Lassay ===
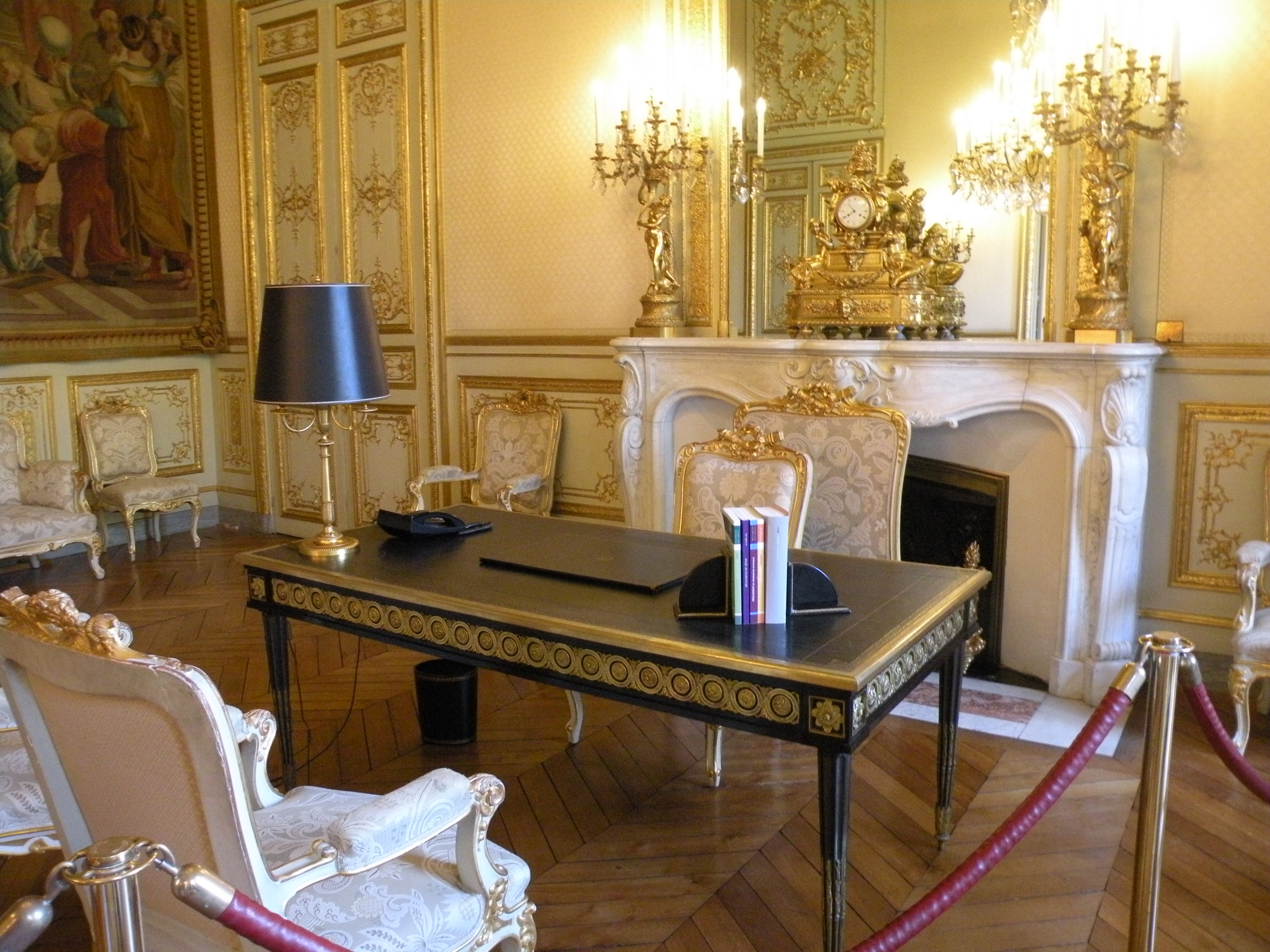
The desk of the president in the Cabinet du Départ

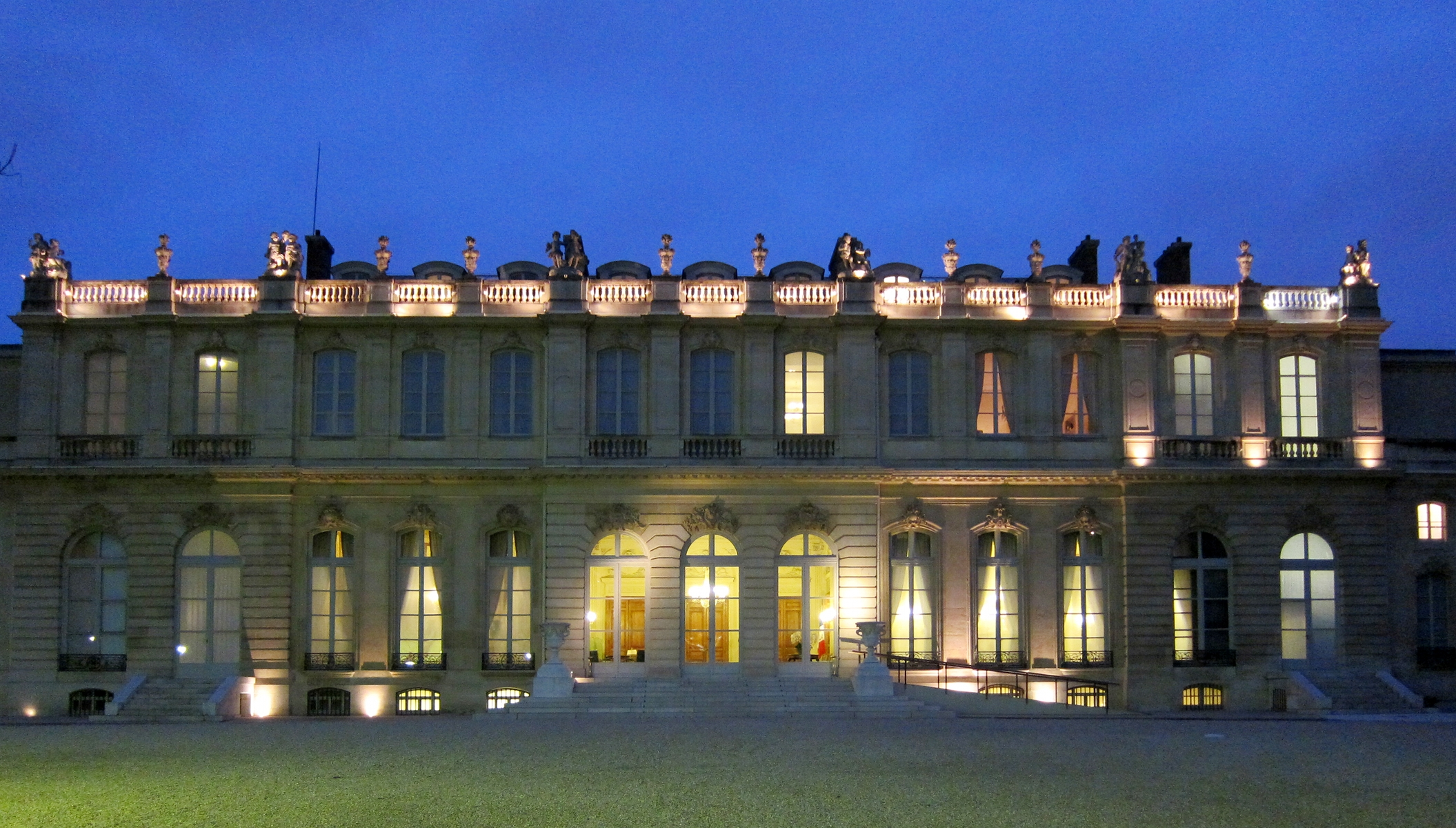
The court façade of the Hôtel de Lassay

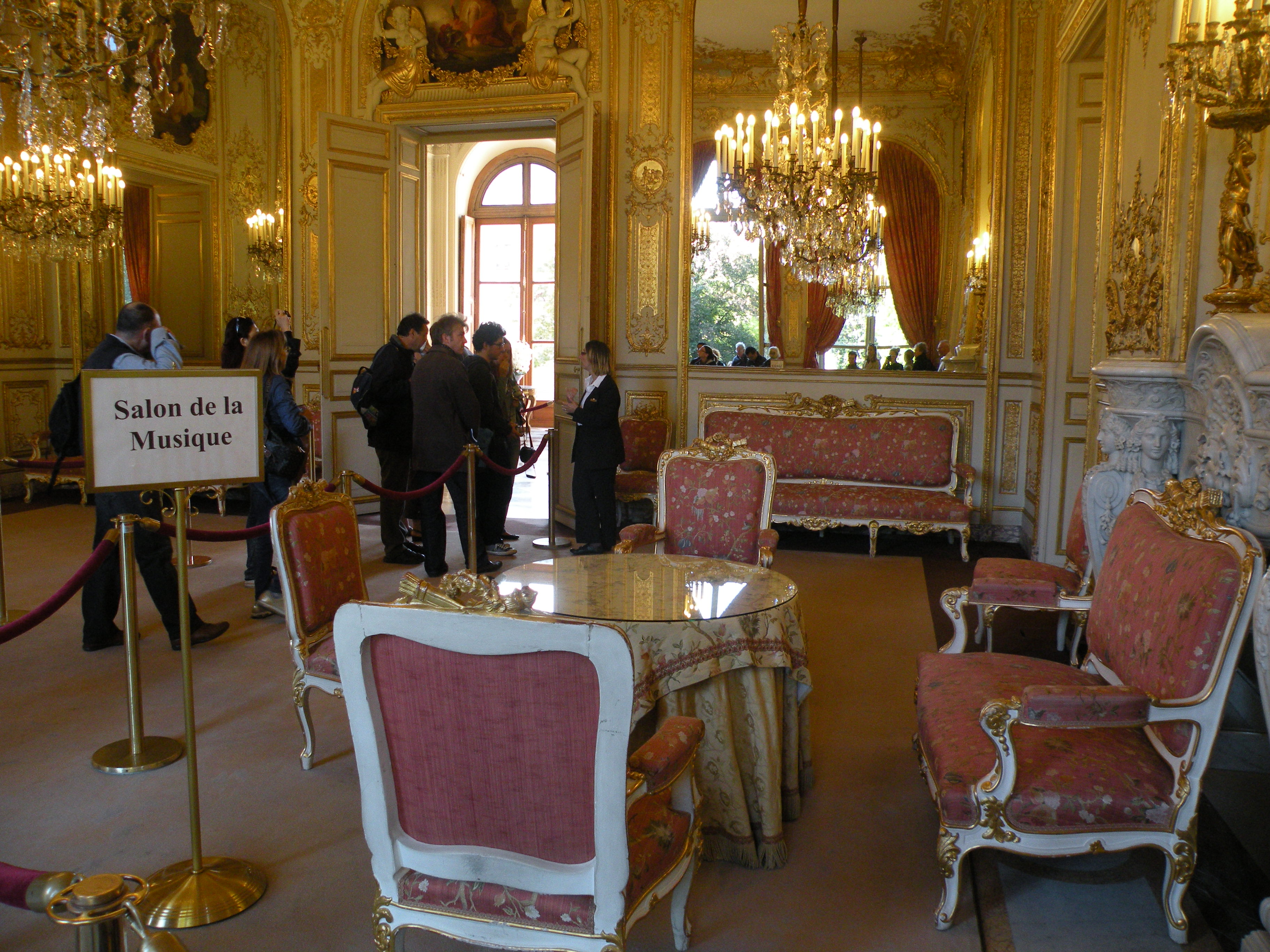
The Grand Salon, or Music Room, which opens onto the garden

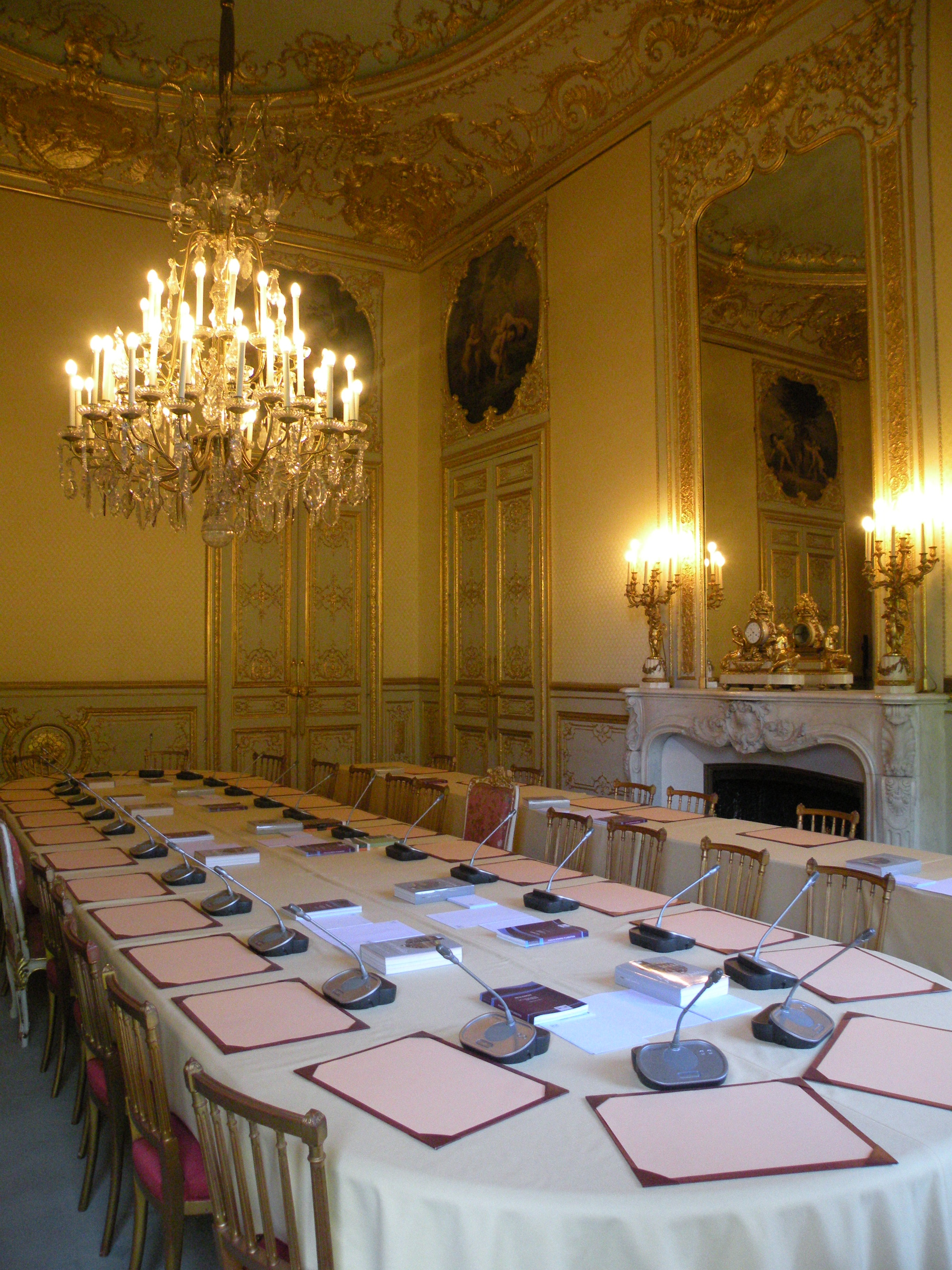
The Salon des Jeux

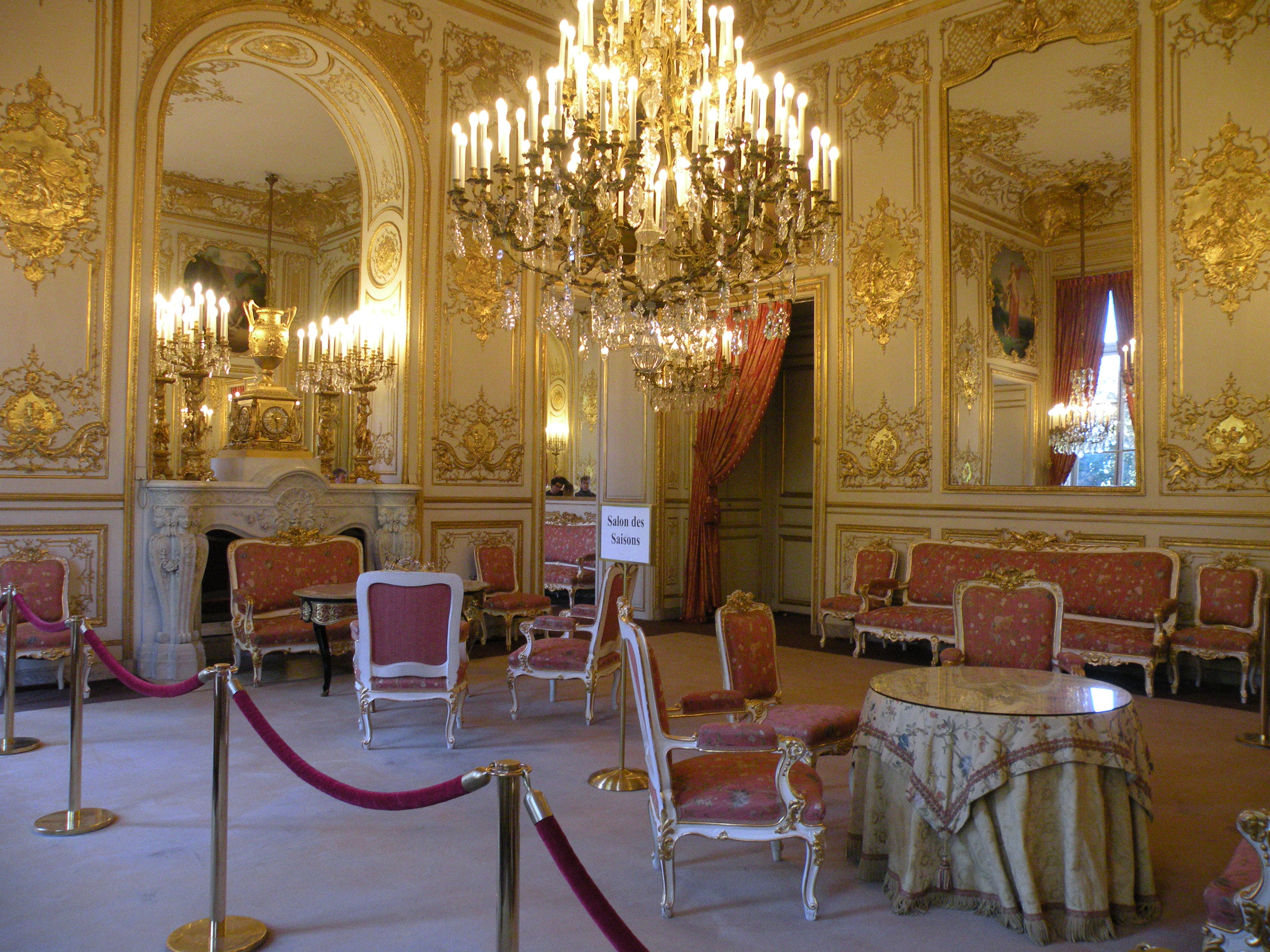
The Salon des Saisons

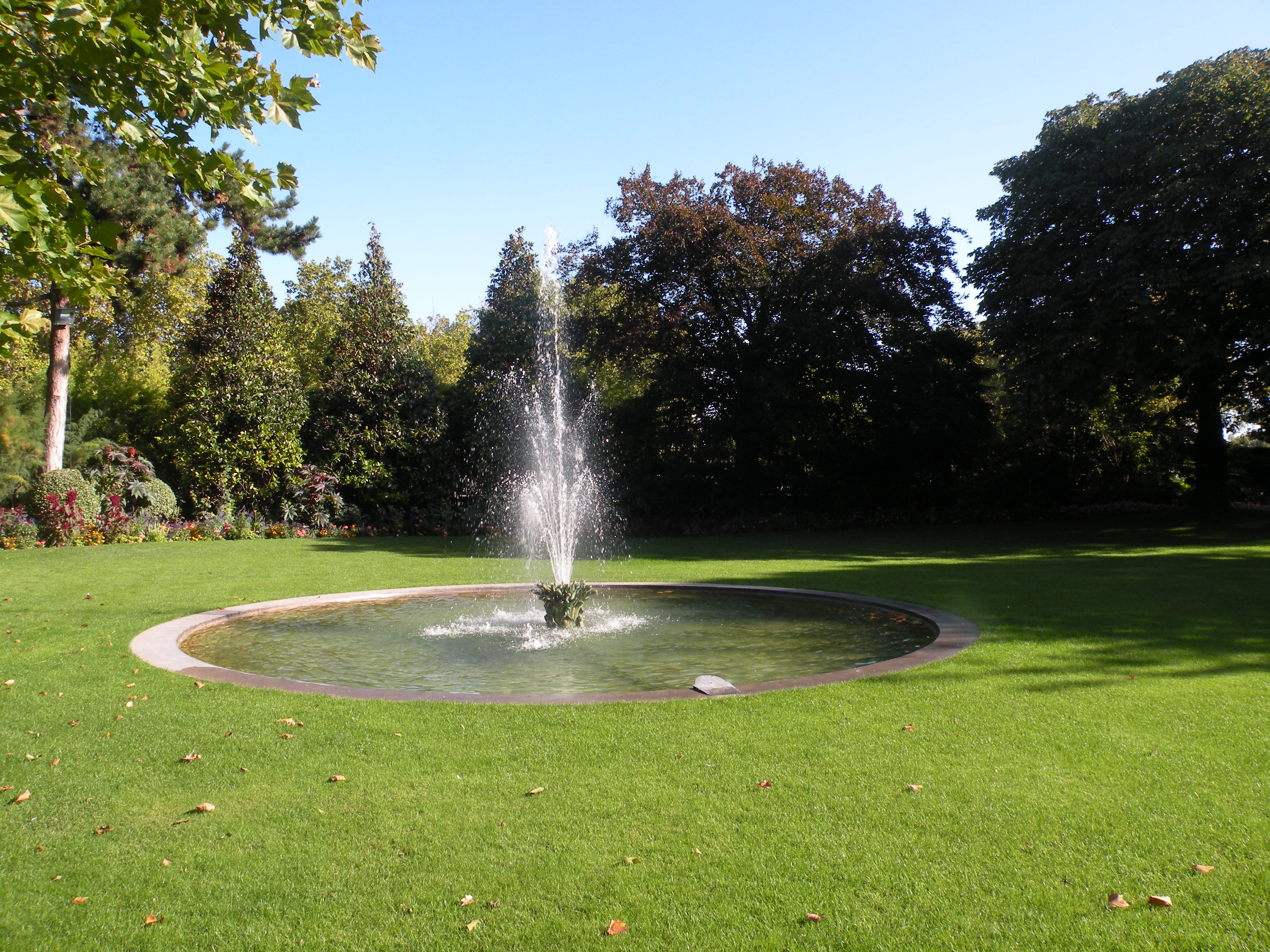
The garden of the Hôtel de Lassay

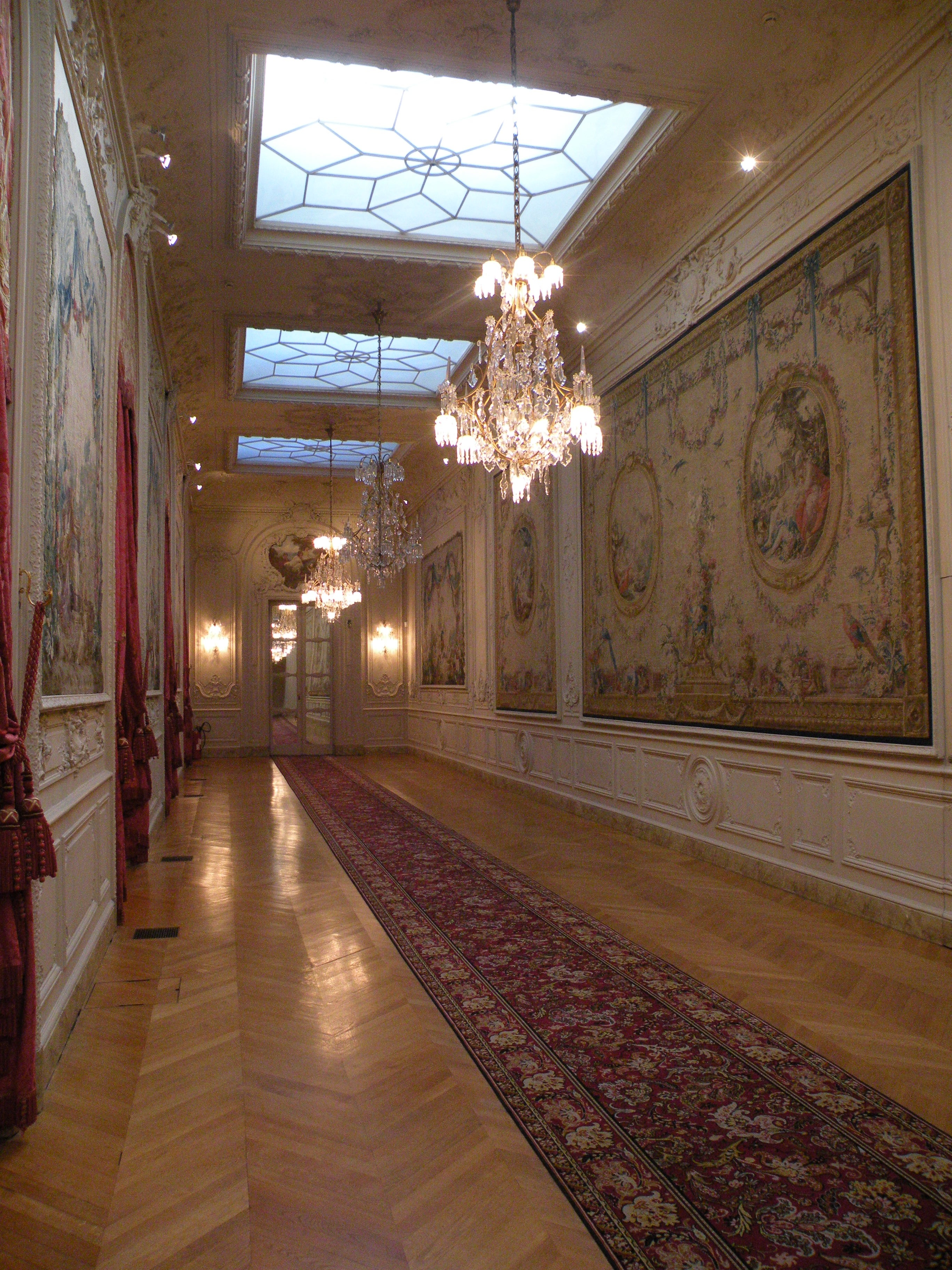
The Gallery of Tapestries

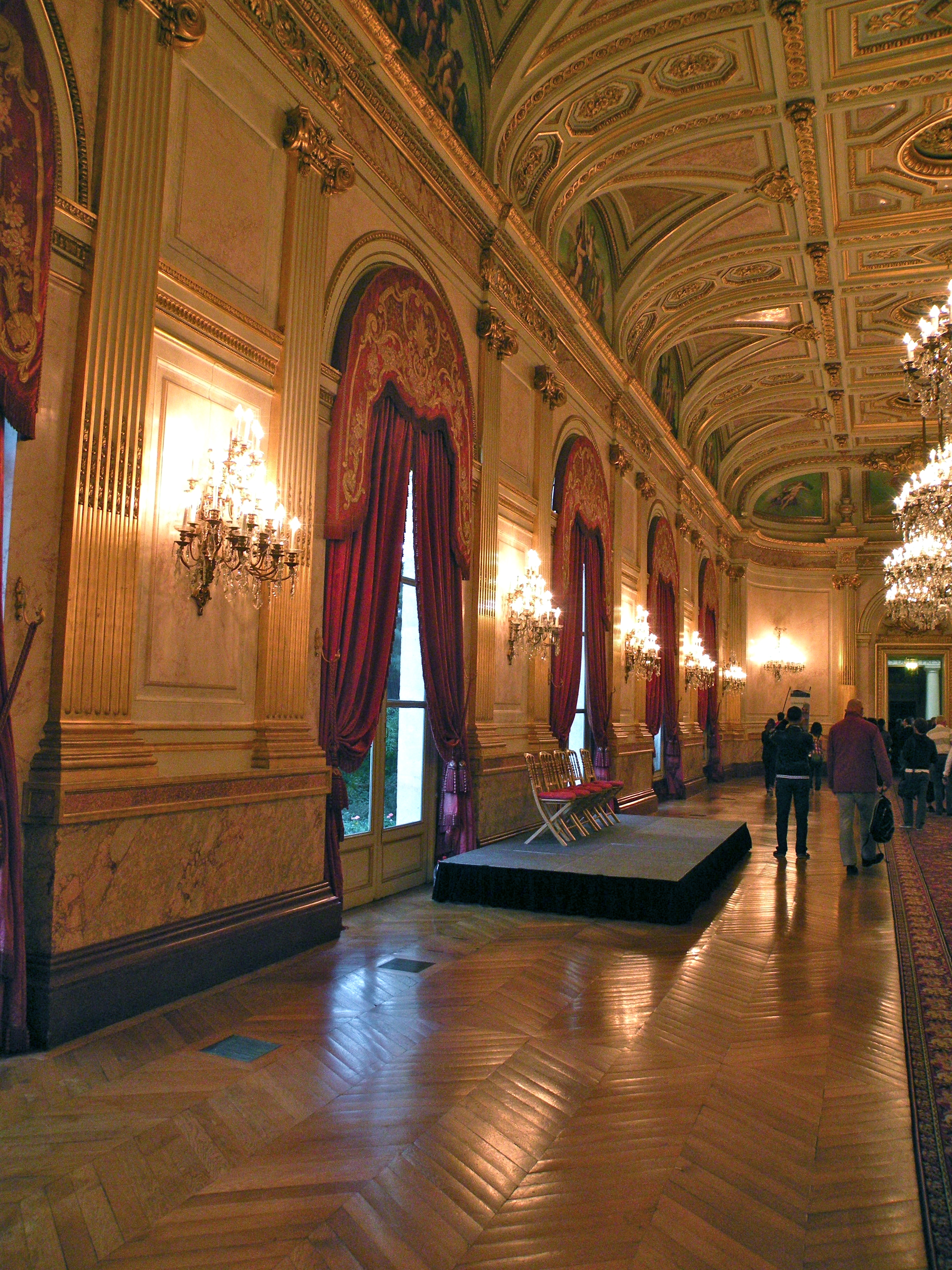
The Salle des Fêtes

The adjacent Hôtel de Lassay, connected by a gallery to the Palais Bourbon, serves as the official residence of the National Assembly's president. The building underwent major reconstruction in 1846–48 which added an additional story, but the 18th century style of the exterior and interior layout of the building was preserved.

The Cabinet du Départ takes its name from its function; the president of the Assembly departs from this room when a bell announces that the 15:00 session of the Assembly is about to begin. The room is lavishly decorated with a carpet from the period of Louis XIV, originally in Grand Gallery of the Louvre Palace; and a tapestry which reproduces the tapestry of the School of Athens by Raphael that hangs over the president's seat in the Assembly Chamber. The room was the original study of the house before the Revolution. The desk was brought from the Palace of Versailles in 1794 during the Revolution for the use of the Committee of Public Safety.

The Salon des Jeux is a conference room on the ground floor of the residence, where the president of the Assembly meets with other Assembly leaders to set the agenda for the sessions. It takes its name from an illustration over the door of a game of lawn bowling by the 18th century artist Heim.

The Salle des Fêtes and the Galerie des Tapisseries are located in the building that connects the Hôtel de Lassay with the Palais Bourbon. The Salle des Fêtes was built between 1846 and 1849, replacing an early wooden passage built in 1809. It is used today for expositions, ceremonies for visiting dignitaries, and the annual New Year's greeting by the president of the Assembly. The Gallerie des Tapisseries was created in 1860 to display a collection of paintings. The paintings were removed in 1865 and replaced in 1900 with a set of nine Beauvais tapestries.

=== Contemporary art ===
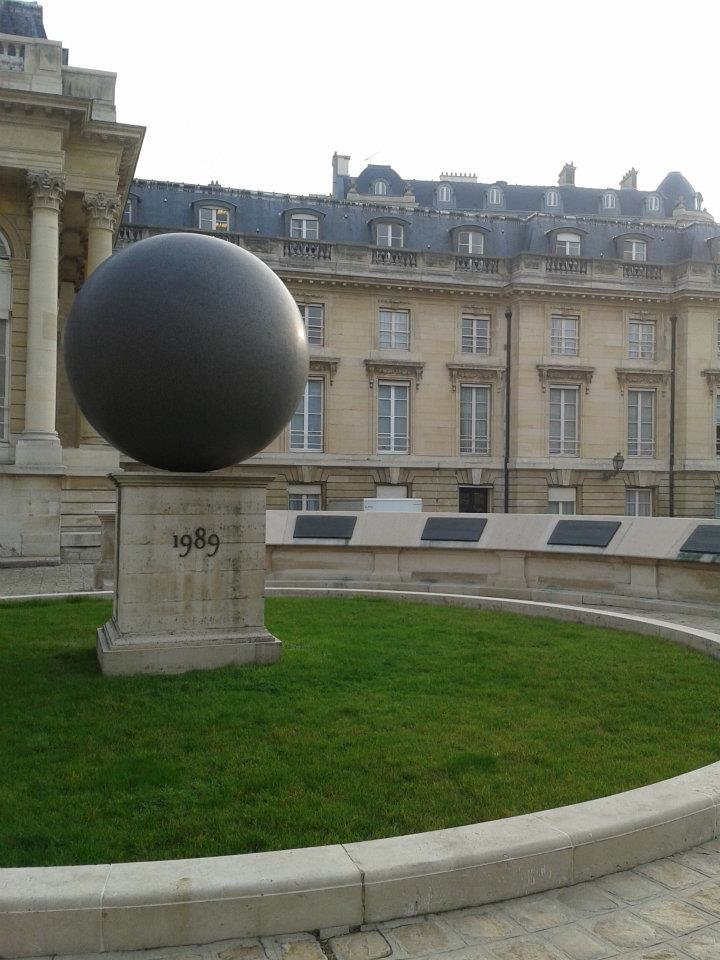
The Sphere of Human Rights by Walter de Maria (1989)

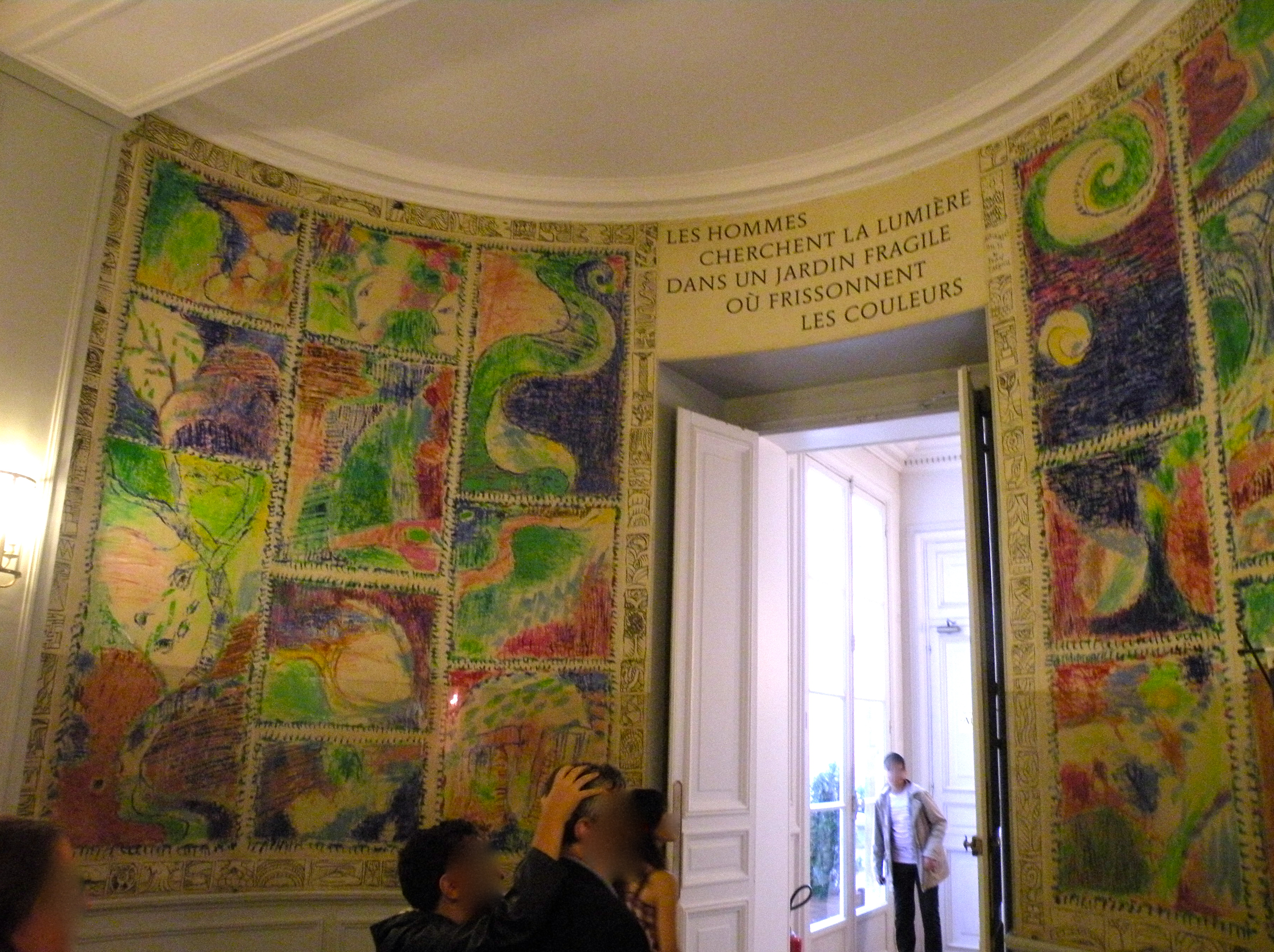
The Rotunda of Alechinsky (1992)

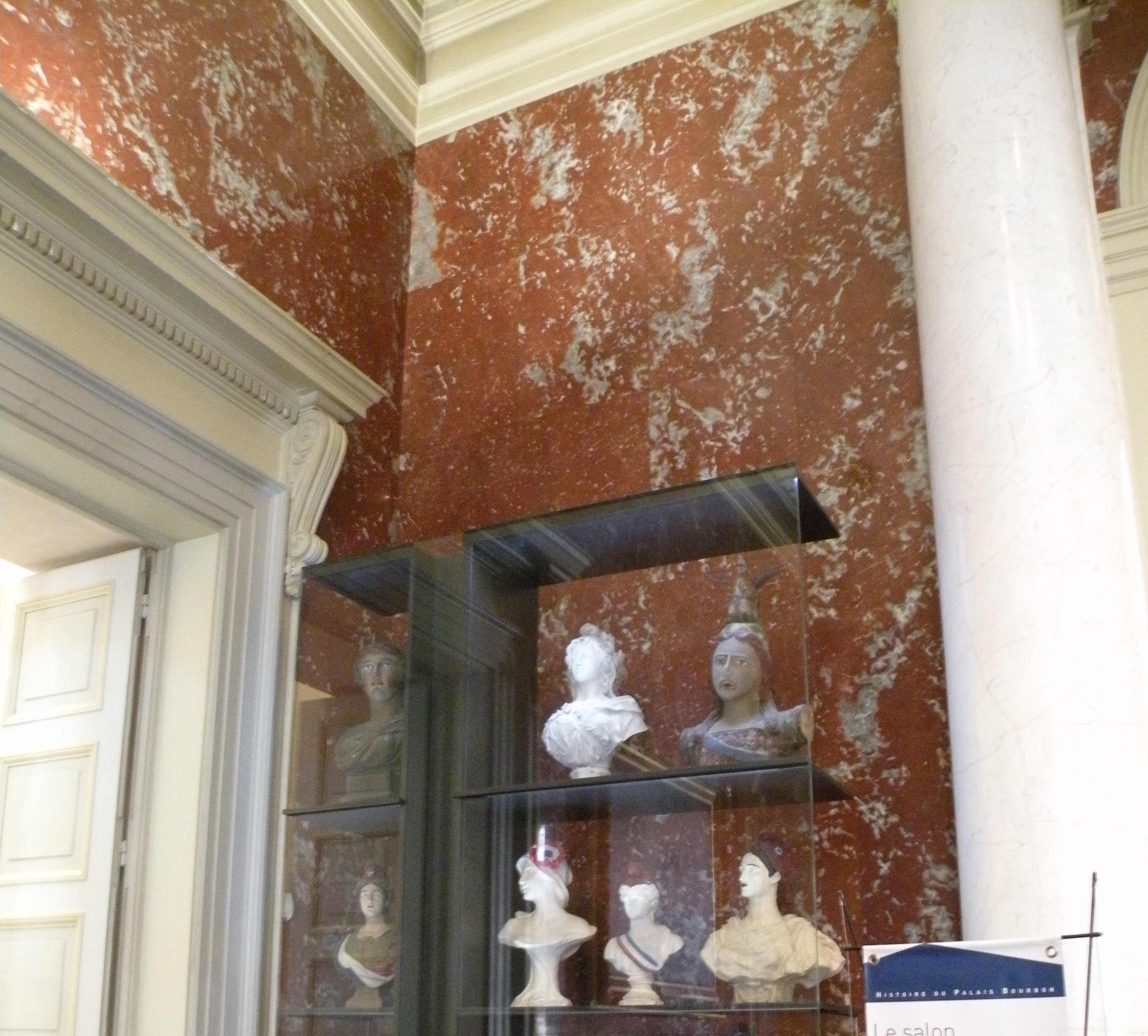
The Salon of Marianne

The Palais Bourbon contains several installations of contemporary art. One is a work of modern sculpture, a large granite sphere on a marble pedestal by the American sculptor Walter De Maria, which was installed in the Cour d'Honneur in 1989 to mark the 200th anniversary of the French Revolution. His design was selected after an international competition; the granite sphere contains a small heart made of gold.

A work by the Belgian artist Pierre Alechinsky was created in 1992 and occupies a small rotunda along the passageway between the Hôtel de Lassay and the Palais Bourbon. It is titled 'The Fragile Garden' and illustrates the words of the poet Jean Tardieu: 'Men search for the light in a fragile garden where the colours tremble'.

The Salon of Marianne, created in 2004, displays busts of Marianne, the symbol of the French Republic, from different periods and in different styles. It has displayed since 2015 a work by the American graffiti artist JonOne, called Liberté, Egalité, Fraternité, based on Delacroix's famous Liberty Leading the People, it symbolises Youth, the Future, and Hope.

There are other notable contemporary works on display in the Palais Bourbon by Hervé Di Rosa, Djamel Tatah, Vincent Barré, and Fabienne Verdier.

== See also ==
- Luxembourg Palace, the seat of the French Senate
- National Assembly (France)
- List of works by James Pradier

== Bibliography ==
- Delpierre, Jean Christophe (1999). Assemblée Nationale. Beaux Arts hors série.
- Fierro, Alfred (1996). Histoire et dictionnaire de Paris. Robert Laffont. ISBN 2-221--07862-4.
- Icikovics, Jean-Pierre; Altmayer, Anastasia (2013). L'Assemblée Nationale. Beaux Arts Éditions. ISBN 978-284278-977-0.
