= April 1958 =

Month of 1958

<<	April 1958					>>
Su	Mo	Tu	We	Th	Fr	Sa
		1	2	3	4	5
6	7	8	9	10	11	12
13	14	15	16	17	18	19
20	21	22	23	24	25	26
27	28	29	30

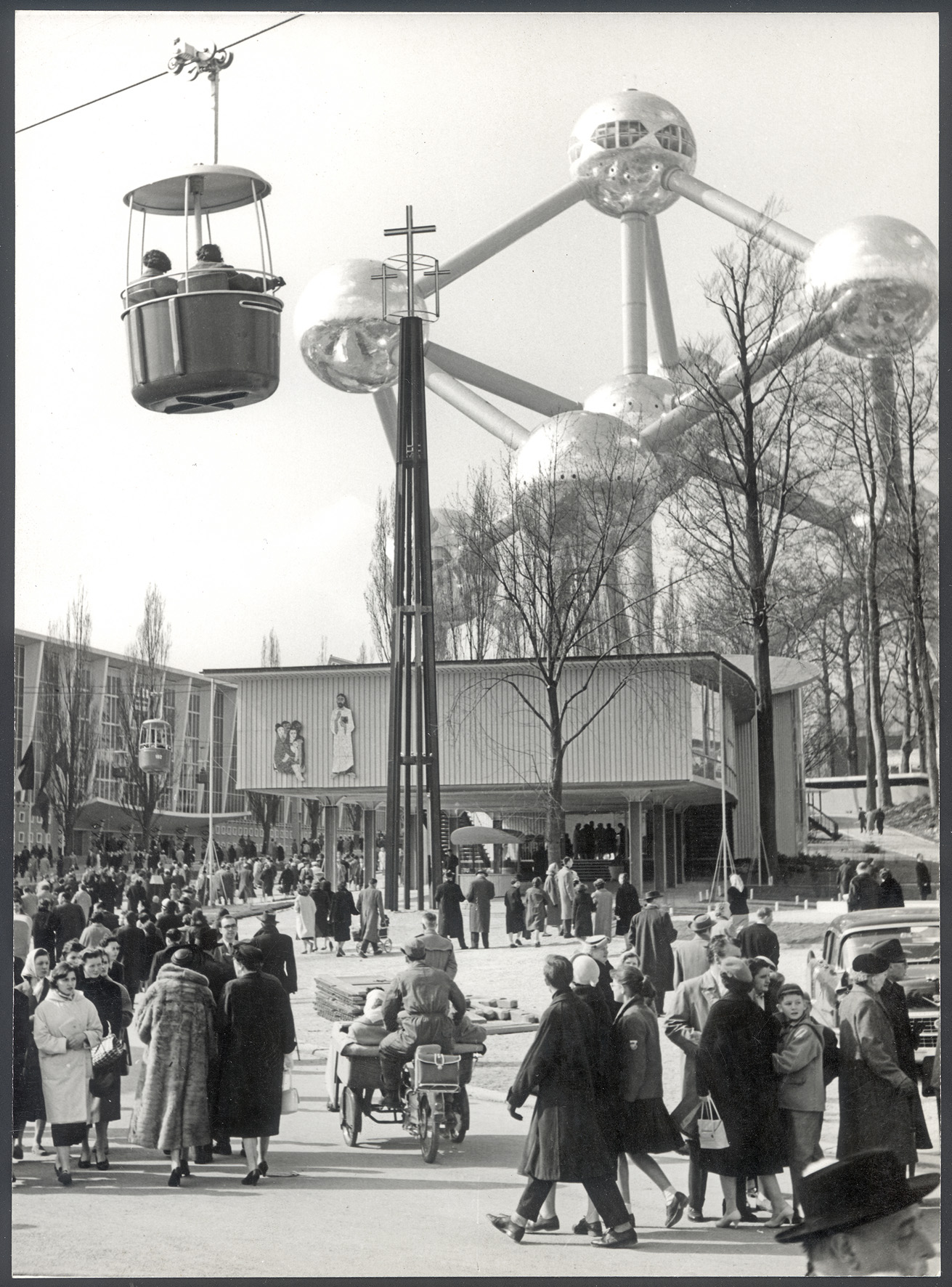
April 17, 1958: Expo 58 world's fair opens in Brussels

The following events happened in April 1958:

== April 1, 1958 (Tuesday) ==
- Spain ended its protectorate over most of southern Morocco, ceding the territory of Cape Juby, with the signing of the Treaty of Angra de Cintra by Spain's Foreign Minister Fernando María Castiella y Maíz and Morocco's Foreign Minister Ahmed Balafrej meeting at Dakhla in the colony of the Spanish Sahara. The treaty ended the five month long Ifni War between Moroccan insurgents and the Spanish Army.
- One million public workers in France went on a 24-hour strike to seek wage increases of 10 to 25 percents, shutting down all public transportation by bus, subway, train or airplane.
- The ballet Clytemnestra, choreographed by Martha Graham, had its first performance, premiering at the Adelphi Theatre in New York City.
- Born: Dr. Hasnat Khan, Pakistan-born British heart surgeon known for his relationship with Princess Diana; in Jhelum, Punjab province

== April 2, 1958 (Wednesday) ==
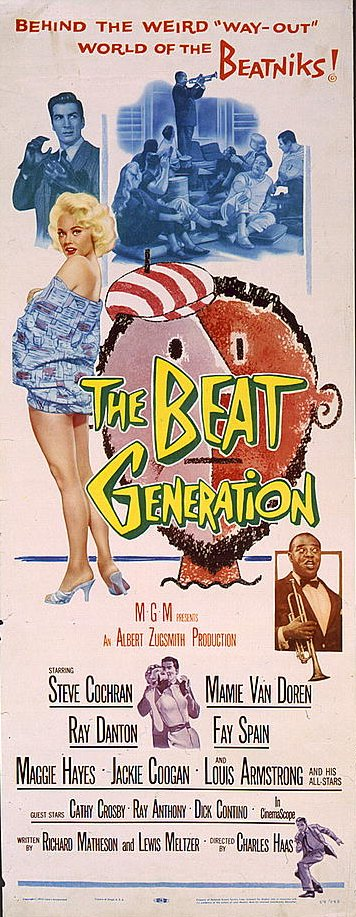
A 1959 film about "beatniks"

- The word "beatnik", used to describe an anti-conformist youth who embraced the culture of what Jack Kerouac called "The Beat Generation", was introduced by San Francisco Chronicle columnist Herb Caen in his daily newspaper column. Caen's coined word was a portmanteau of "Beat" and of "Sputnik", the satellite which had been launched almost six months earlier by the Soviet Union. Caen's column, under the heading "Words, Words, Words", referred to a recent party hosted by Look magazine for a photo essay on the Beat Generation in a "beach house for 50 Beatniks", and commented, "They're only Beat, y'know, when it comes to work..."
- U.S. President Dwight D. Eisenhower sent a message to Congress advocating the establishment of a civilian agency to direct nonmilitary space exploration. U.S. Representative Harry G. Haskell Jr. of Delaware introduced the legislation, approved by both houses of Congress by July 16, to create the National Aeronautics and Space Administration (NASA).
- Workers digging a trench in the town of Caernarfon, in Wales, accidentally discovered the ruins of the Caernarfon Mithraeum, a Roman temple in what is now Wales and constructed by Roman Britons worshiping the Zoroastrian god Mithras.
- Delaware became the first U.S. state in almost 47 years (and the seventh overall) to abolish capital punishment, as Governor J. Caleb Boggs signed a bill that had passed the state house of representatives, 18–11, after being sponsored by Senator Elwood F. Melson Jr. and approved the year before by the state senate. Delaware's last execution, a hanging, had taken place on December 7, 1945, when Anderson D. Butler was executed for raping a child. No new U.S. states had acted since North Dakota had repealed the death penalty in 1911.
- Died:
  - Willie Maley, 89, Scottish soccer football player manager who coached Celtic F.C. for 43 years (1897 to 1940) and led them to 16 league championships and 14 Scottish Cups
  - Jōsei Toda, 58, Japanese Buddhist activist who co-founded the Soka Gakkai movement in 1930 and had led it since 1951

== April 3, 1958 (Thursday) ==
- The effectiveness of 5-Fluorouracil, a new anti-cancer drug, developed at the McArdle Laboratory in Madison, Wisconsin, was announced at a press conference at Madison by its inventor, Dr. Charles Heidelberger, an oncologist at the University of Wisconsin Hospital. The drug, still used in chemotherapy as a treatment of colorectal cancer, oesophageal cancer, stomach cancer, pancreatic cancer, breast cancer, and cervical cancer, is marketed under the name Adrucil.
- New York Justice Harry B. Frank dismissed the last attempt to stop baseball's New York Giants from moving to San Francisco, after reviewing a lawsuit brought in August by a stockholder in the team, Julius November. Frank wrote that "Beneath these judicial robes still beats the heart of a Giant fan," but added, "The court, as distinguished from Justice Frank the fan, must find that the plaintiff's contentions, while sentimentally four-baggers, are legally outs."
- Born:
  - Alec Baldwin, American TV and film actor; in Amityville, New York
  - Clifford Nass, American communications professor at Stanford University who (with co-researcher Byron Reeves) formulated "Media equation"; in Teaneck, New Jersey (d. 2013 of a heart attack)

== April 4, 1958 (Friday) ==
- The first protest march by the Campaign for Nuclear Disarmament in the United Kingdom began in London. Starting at Trafalgar Square, the march over the next four days to Aldermaston, Berkshire, site of the Atomic Weapons Establishment, manufacturer of the UK's nuclear weapons. During the march, the peace symbol was first displayed, printed on "Ban the Bomb" placards made by the children of the symbol's creator, Gerald Holtom. (6 April 2008).
- Cheryl Crane, the 14-year-old daughter of film actress Lana Turner, stabbed and killed Turner's abusive boyfriend, Johnny Stompanato, at Turner's home in Beverly Hills, California. Crane turned herself in to the police, and, after a public hearing, a coroner's inquest ruled that her killing of Stompanato was justifiable homicide and released her.
- Born:
  - Vichai Srivaddhanaprabha, Thai billionaire businessman and sports team owner; in Bangkok (killed in helicopter crash, 2010)
  - Adil al-Kalbani, Afro-Saudi Islamic cleric who make the first Imam of African-descent to lead the prayers at the Great Mosque of Mecca; in Riyadh
  - Karen Oliveto, the first openly lesbian bishop of the United Methodist Church; in West Babylon, New York
  - Cazuza (stage name for Agenor de Miranda Araújo), Brazilian rock singer; in Rio de Janeiro (died of septic shock, 1990)
- Died: María Luisa Sepúlveda, 59, Chilean composer

== April 5, 1958 (Saturday) ==
- A fast-moving bushfire killed 8 firefighters at Mount Gambler as they were battling the blaze at a pine tree plantation near the small town of Wandilo, South Australia.
- In China, the crash of a CAAC Airlines flight from Xi'an to Taiyuan killed all 14 people on board.
- The People's Daily, the newspaper of the Chinese Communist Party, announced the initial success of the Party's program of training former factory owners to become ordinary employees of the businesses they once owned. The move was made as part of bringing to an end the five-percent per year compensation to the former owners for the Communist seizure of their investments, scheduled to end by 1962. Citing examples of the benevolent treatment where owners were "permitted" to work at the factories they once guided, the newspaper commented that "Most of the capitalists behind lathes and counters obeyed the instructions of officials, respected discipline, worked hard and learned submissively from the workers."

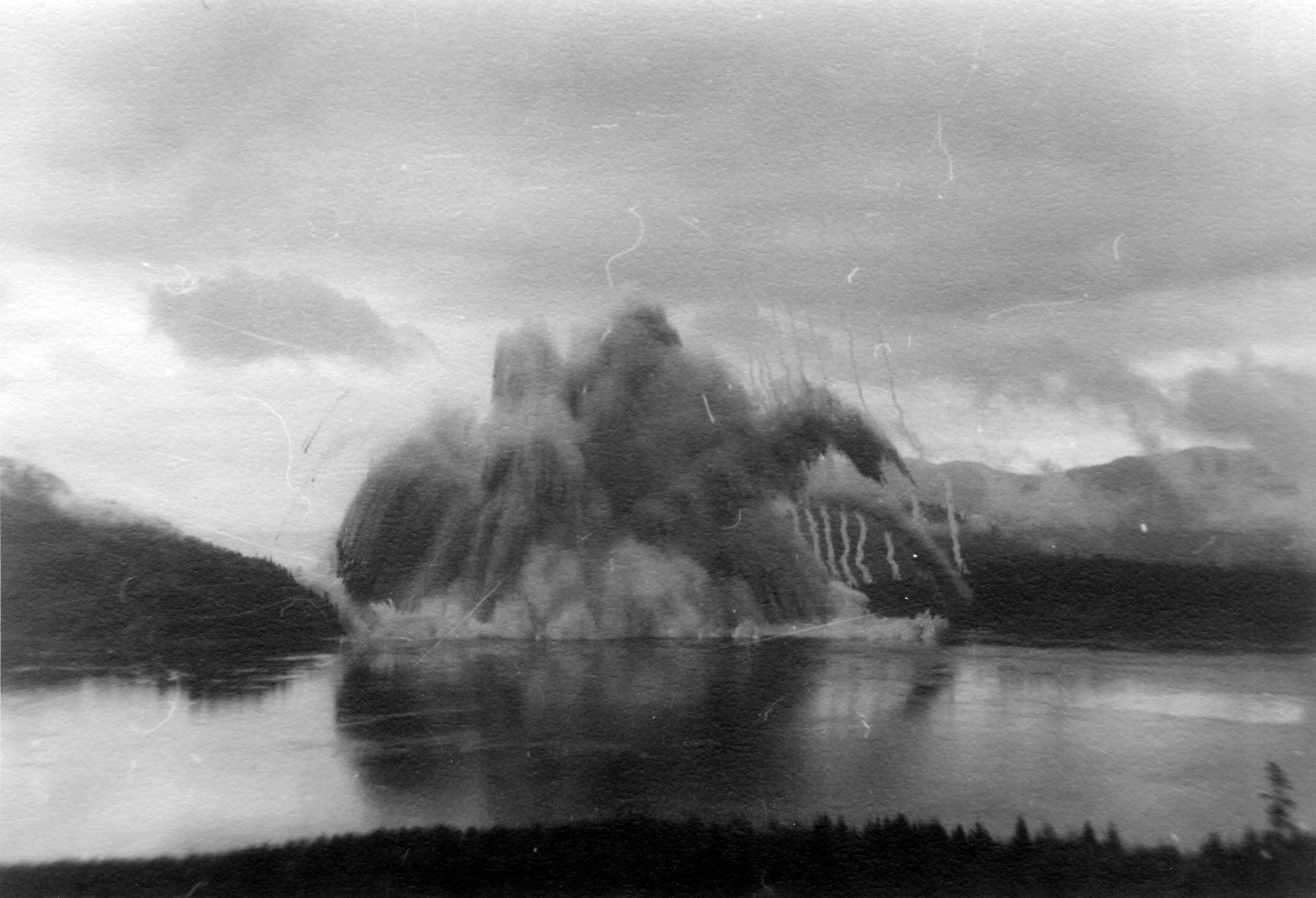
The blasting of Ripple Rock

- The top of "Ripple Rock", an underwater mountain that had been a hazard to ship travel within the Inside Passage through British Columbia's waters, was destroyed in what remains the largest controlled non-nuclear explosion in North America. Based on a study by the National Research Council of Canada, contractors of the Canadian government of Canada had spent more than two years to drill two long tunnels in which to place 1,270 metric tonnes (almost 2.8 million pounds) of Nitramex 2H explosive, and at 9:31 in the morning local time, detonated the weapon. The event was televised live on Canadian television in a coast-to-coast hookup.

== April 6, 1958 (Sunday) ==
- In the U.S., Capital Airlines Flight 67 crashed in a snowstorm on its approach to the Tri-City Airport in Freeland, Michigan, killing all 47 people on board. The turboprop Vickers Viscount had departed from Flint as part of a multi-stop flight between New York and Chicago. and had an undetected buildup of ice on its horizontal stabilizer. When the crew attempted a steep turn on landing, the airplane stalled and went into a spin.
- Arnold Palmer of Latrobe, Pennsylvania, a former paint salesman, hung on to win his first major professional golf championship with a one-stroke victory in the 1958 Masters Tournament. Palmer, ahead of everyone else by at least three strokes going into the final round, faced a challenge from defending Masters winner Doug Ford and by Fred Hawkins.
- The divorce of Queen Soraya Esfandiary-Bakhtiari from the Shah of Iran, Mohammad Reza Pahlavi, became final after having been announced on March 15.
- Died: Vítězslav Nezval, 57, Czech avant-garde writer, from pneumonia

== April 7, 1958 (Monday) ==
- All 32 people aboard Aerovias Ecuador (AREA) Flight 222 were killed when the Douglas DC-3 crashed into a mountain while flying from Guayaquil to Quito. An investigation concluded that the cause was the pilot's decision to fly a more direct route between the two Ecuadorian cities rather than the course authorized for his altitude of 7,500 feet (2,300 m). Shortly after being cleared to climb above the clouds, the airplane crashed into the side of Mount Illiniza in the Chugchilan mountain range.
- Japan unconditionally released the remaining 10 "Class A war criminals" convicted after World War II, after having reached an agreement with the wartime Allied powers. Set free from Sugamo Prison in Tokyo were the two former War Ministers (Sadao Araki and Field Marshal Shunroku Hata), former Finance Minister Okinori Kaya former adviser Kōichi Kido, the former Navy Minister Admiral Shigetarō Shimada, Naoki Hoshino, General Hiroshi Ōshima, Lt. General Teiichi Suzuki, Naoki Hoshino, and Admiral Takasumi Oka. All had been on parole at the time of their pardon.
- Born: Major General Gunnar Karlson, Swedish Army officer and Director of Sweden's Military Intelligence and Security Service (Militära underrättelse- och säkerhetstjänsten, or MUST), from 2012 to 2019; in Karlskrona
- Died: Mark M. Mills, 40, U.S. nuclear physicist and atomic weapons designer, was drowned after the helicopter he was on was forced down at the Eniwetok Atoll.

== April 8, 1958 (Tuesday) ==
- A U.S. Air Force KC-135 Stratotanker became the first airplane to fly more than 10,000 miles (16,000 km) without refueling, landing at the Lajes Air Force Base in Portugal's Azores islands, 18 hours and 48 minutes after its departure from Tokyo, for a total distance of 10,233 miles (16,468 km).
- The first, and only, film shown with the widescreen process of "Cinemiracle", the travel documentary Windjammer, premiered at Grauman's Chinese Theatre in Hollywood, California, where it would run for 36 weeks. The next day, the Roxy Theatre in New York City began showing the film as well and would do so for the next 22 weeks. Regarding the film, critic Bosley Crowther of The New York Times wrote, "Every last moviegoer with a drop of salt in his blood will want to swing aboard 'Windjammer'... this giant, panoramic picture of the new Cinemiracle process, which is again to Cinerama, is so full of the thrills and beauties of ocean sailing that it takes the breath away." Los Angeles Times critic Philip K. Scheuer praised the photography but wrote that "As dramatic storytelling the film is a disappointment... the first half is monotonously repetitive and lacking in high spots or excitement." Patents for the Cinemiracle process would be purchased by the owners of the older Cinerama process, which used a wider 146° curved screen.
- Residents of the Los Angeles suburb of Monte Vista, California, voted overwhelmingly, 1,399 to 212, in favor of changing the name of the city to Montclair, because of the existence of an older, unincorporated community in Placer County. Monte Vista had been incorporated on April 26, 1956. There were no objections from the similar-sounding city of Claremont, incorporated in 1907 and on the north border of Montclair.
- Died:
  - Alcibíades Arosemena, 74, former President of Panama from 1951 to 1952
  - Frank Eaton, 97, American lawman, author and entertainer who performed under the name "Pistol Pete"
  - Frank Kingdon-Ward, 72, English botanist and author
  - George Jean Nathan, 76, American drama critic

== April 9, 1958 (Wednesday) ==
- In Ceylon (now Sri Lanka), the 1957 Bandaranaike–Chelvanayakam Pact to allow some self-government for the minority (and primarily Hindu) Tamil community, was unilaterally renounced in dramatic fashion by Prime Minister S. W. R. D. Bandaranaike after protests by the (primarily Buddhist Sinhalese majority and discontent among the Tamils led by S. J. V. Chelvanayakam. When a group of 100 Buddhist monks and 300 Sinhalese supporters staged a protest outside the prime minister's residence at Rosemead Place in Colombo, Bandaranaike came out and tore up a copy of the agreement, then promised to rescind its terms. One Tamil politician, Savumiamoorthy Thondaman, called the date "the saddest day in the history of Ceylon's racial relations."
- The Douglas DC-8, a four-engine jet airliner, with seating for 177 passengers, was first rolled out of the Douglas Aircraft Company hangar at Long Beach, California, and would make its first test flight on May 30, before beginning commercial service on September 18, 1959.
- A planned nationwide labor strike in Cuba, planned by Fidel Castro's 26th of July Movement to destabilize the regime of dictator Fulgencio Batista, failed because the Batista regime had learned of the plans before they could be carried out.
- Born: Dr. Nadey Hakim, British and Lebanese transplantation surgeon
- Died:
  - Alfred Veillet, 76, French painter
  - Sol M. Wurtzel, 67, American film producer for 20th Century Fox

== April 10, 1958 (Thursday) ==
- The death sentence of convicted Nazi war criminal Carl Oberg, known as "The Butcher of Paris" for deporting over 40,000 French Jews to German concentration camps, was commuted by France's President Vincent Auriol to life imprisonment. A year later, President René Coty reduced the sentence to 20 years hard labor and on November 28, 1962, President Charles de Gaulle gave Oberg a pardon.
- Born:
  - Yefim Bronfman, Soviet-born American classical pianist; in Tashkent, Uzbek SSR, Soviet Union
  - Leonid Solodkov, Soviet Ukrainian diver and the last person to be awarded the honor Hero of the Soviet Union in Chornukhyne, Ukrainian SSR, Soviet Union. Solodkov was presented the medal on December 24, 1991, two days before the dissolution of the Soviet Union.
- Died: Chuck Willis, 32, American rock and roll singer known as "The King of the Stroll", died of peritonitis while in surgery for stomach ulcers.

== April 11, 1958 (Friday) ==
- Prime Minister Félix Gaillard gave the final order for France to become the fourth nation to possess the atomic bomb, and ordered the French Army to prepare the first test of the French fission weapon. The Gerboise Bleue test would be carried out successfully on February 13, 1960.
- Born:
  - Hussniya Jabara, the first Israeli Arab to be a member of the Knesset 1999–2003; in Tayibe
  - Luc Luycx, Belgian graphics designer and medalist who created the profile for the 1996 series of Euro coins; in Aalst
- Died: Konstantin Yuon, 82, Soviet Russian painter who co-founded the Association of Artists of Revolutionary Russia, later superseded by the government-operated Artists' Union of the USSR

== April 12, 1958 (Saturday) ==
- The St. Louis Hawks defeated the visiting Boston Celtics by a single point, 110 to 109, to win Game 6 of the 1958 NBA Finals and the championship of the National Basketball Association, 4 games to 2. The Hawks' Bob Pettit scored 50 points in the deciding game, including 19 in the final quarter. Bill Russell, the star of the Celtics, was unable to play because of a severe ankle injury in Game 3. All four of the Hawks' wins over the Celtics were close games (104–102, 111–108, 102-100 and 110–109) while their two losses were by double digits (136-112 and 109–98).
- Born: Ginka Zagorcheva, Bulgarian athlete who held the world record for the women's 100m hurdles and won the 1987 world championship; in Plovdiv

== April 13, 1958 (Sunday) ==
- The Tony Awards, named for Antoinette Perry and emblematic of the best performances on Broadway, were presented at the Waldorf-Astoria. Sunrise at Campobello was named the best play, and The Music Man the best musical.

== April 14, 1958 (Monday) ==
- The Soviet satellite Sputnik 2, which had (on November 3, 1957) become the second man-made object ever be launched into orbit around the Earth, re-entered the atmosphere and burned up as it traveled on a line from the U.S. state of New York to the impact of its remaining debris in the Amazon region of South America. Sputnik 2 had been notable for carrying the first animal into space, the dog Laika, who had died shortly after the craft's launch.
- U.S. pianist Harvey Levan Cliburn of Kilgore, Texas, who was better known as Van Cliburn, won the International Tchaikovsky Competition for piano, hosted by the Soviet Union in Moscow. After the awards, Cliburn was invited to the Kremlin where he played piano at a reception hosted by Soviet Premier and First Secretary Nikita Khrushchev.
- All 16 people aboard an Aviaco Airlines flight in Spain were killed when the DH.114 Heron airplane dived to avoid a collision with another airplane that had flown into its path. The Aviaco flight had taken off from Zaragoza and was preparing to land at Barcelona when the other aircraft made its takeoff at the same time. When the pilot veered to avoid a crash at 150 metres (490 ft), the Aviaco airplane went out of control and plunged into the Mediterranean Sea.
- The first demonstration on live television of instant playback of videotape was demonstrated on the BBC news programme Panorama. Host Richard Dimbleby sat in front of a clock as he discussed BBC's new Vision Electronic Recording Apparatus (VERA) system, then rewound the tape and played it for the television audience.
- Born: Peter Capaldi, Scottish comedian, TV actor and film director, known for portraying Doctor Who from 2014 to 2017; in Glasgow
- Died: Frank Kent, 80, American journalist for the Baltimore Sun whose nationally syndicated column, "The Great Game of Politics", ran from 1923 until three months before his death. Kent's final column ran on January 5, 1958.

== April 15, 1958 (Tuesday) ==
- After losing a vote of no confidence in his government, 321 to 255, Félix Gaillard resigned as Prime Minister of France.
- The United States agreed to the extension of territorial waters from the historical limit of 3 miles (4.8 km) off a nation's coast, to 6 miles (9.7 km). The compromise broke a deadlock in the United Nations Conference on the Law of the Sea.
- One man was killed and 31 people injured in a fire on the third floor of the Museum of Modern Art in New York City, when a worker let a cigarette fall on an oil-soaked drop-cloth. Because of remodeling to install air-conditioning in the Museum, most of the paintings by artists had been moved, but six works of art were damaged, and one of Claude Monet's "Water Lilies" paintings was destroyed.
- Club León, which had finished fifth in Primera División de México regular season, defeated league champion Atlético Zacatepec, 5 to 2, on the second leg of the finals of Mexico's professional soccer football tournament, to win the Copa México. The teams had played to a 1 to 1 draw earlier.
- The San Francisco Giants beat the Los Angeles Dodgers in the first Major League Baseball regular season game ever played in California. As sportswriter Lawrence E. Davies of The New York Times noted, "Big league baseball spanned the continent today. The eighty-two-year-old National League finally became a national league in fact." The season opener, which the Giants won 8 to 0 before a sellout crowd of 23,448 fans at San Francisco's Seals Stadium, was the first for both of the National League's former New York City teams, who had ended 1957 as the New York Giants and the Brooklyn Dodgers.
- Born: Daniel V. Jones, American hotel maintenance worker who committed suicide on live television in order to protest the actions of health maintenance organizations; in Long Beach, California (d. 1998)
- Died:
  - Aurora Jiménez de Palacios, 35, the first woman elected to the Mexican Congress, was killed in a plane crash.
  - Estelle Taylor, 63, American silent film star, died from cancer

== April 16, 1958 (Wednesday) ==
- Tons of radioactive waste were accidentally released on the area in and around the Soviet mining town of Mayluu-Suu in the Kirghiz SSR (now the Republic of Kyrgyzstan) when a damburst caused the #7 tailings containment pile to spill 600,000 cubic metres (21,000,000 cu ft) into the Mailuu-Suu River and in turn to the larger Kara Darya River.
- Elections were held in South Africa for the 156 of the 159 seats in the Volksraad, the nation's unicameral parliament. Unlike the 1953 election, which had allowed some black and coloured electors in the Natal province, the 1958 vote was the first to be limited to white voters. The National Party (NP), led by white supremacist Prime Minister J. G. Strijdom, increased its majority over the United Party to a 103 to 53 balance.
- King Mohammed V of Morocco dissolved the government of Prime Minister Mbarek Bekkay, who had become the first premier of the North African kingdom since the end of the French Protectorate in 1955. Ahmed Balafrej would be appointed by the King to form a new government on May 12.
- Bestselling author Pearl S. Buck confirmed that she had written five additional novels between 1945 and 1953 under the pseudonym "John Sedges". During the same period, she published eight novels under her own name. Buck, whose announcement was made in conjunctions with the release the next day of three of the novels as the book American Triptych, explained that after having been known for living in and writing about China, she wanted to write novels about life in the U.S. and said, "To provide freedom for this American me, pseudonymity was the answer. I chose the name of John Sedges, a simple one, and masculine because men have fewer handicaps in our society than women have in writing as well as in other professions."
- Died:
  - Rosalind Franklin, 37, English chemist, molecular biologist and x-ray crystallographer whose images of DNA led to the discovery of the double helix pattern, died of complications from ovarian cancer.
  - W. Kerr Scott, 61, U.S. Senator for North Carolina since 1954 and Governor from 1949 to 1953, died a day before his 62nd birthday and one week after he had suffered a heart attack. Scott's death temporarily reduced the Democratic Party's majority in the Senate to 48 to 47, although it was expected that North Carolina's Democrat governor would appoint a Democrat as successor.
  - Margaret Burke Sheridan, 70, Irish opera prima donna nicknamed "Maggie of Mayo"

== April 17, 1958 (Thursday) ==
- In Laeken, a suburb of Brussels, King Baudouin of Belgium opened Expo 58, the 1958 World's Fair, for its six-month run. Expo 58 featured pavilions from 45 nations, as well as those of Belgium and the Belgian Congo (still an African colony at that time, and now the Democratic Republic of the Congo). The only monument now remaining from the exposition, the Atomium, formed the centerpiece of the World's Fair. The Fair would close on October 19, 1958, after having had 42,000,000 visitors, and one million would visit on the final day.
- Cuba's dictator Fulgencio Batista issued a decree making all employees of public service companies part of the island nation's armed forces, subject to being called up for active duty, as part of the state of national emergency recently authorized by the Cuban Congress to combat the insurgency of Fidel Castro. The move was made to make walking out on strike an offense punishable as being absent without leave and was made in response to the April 9 call for a walkout.
- The Indonesian Army recaptured the city of Padang from anti-government rebels in a 12-hour operation of amphibious and paratroop assault on the island of Sumatra.
- The spark for the "Xunhua Incident", rioting that would eventually lead to the deaths of 435 members of the Tibetan and Salar minority groups in the People's Republic of China, happened in Tibet after the Communist government had arrested an outspoken Buddhist monk, Jnana Pal Rinpoche. Angry villagers in the village of Gangca detained the Chinese Communist Party (CCP) official assigned to Gangca County. A CCP task force was sent in response, and a team leader of that force was killed, after which rioting began in Gangca and in neighboring Xunhua County. By April 24, the Chinese Army was sent to suppress a riot over 4,000 people.
- Born: Diane Elam, American feminist writer; in Riverside, California
- Died: Rita Montaner, 57, Cuban singer, film actress and TV entertainer

== April 18, 1958 (Friday) ==
- A test flight of the new Grumman F11F-1F Super Tiger jet fighter set a record as the pilot, U.S. Navy Lieutenant Commander George C. Watkins, reached the highest altitude attained by a human being up to that time, 76,939 feet (23,451 m), or 14.57 miles above the Earth.
- The first regular season major league baseball game in Los Angeles, California, was played as 78,672 fans at the city's Memorial Coliseum. The new Los Angeles Dodgers (formerly the Brooklyn Dodgers of New York City) defeated the visiting San Francisco Giants (formerly the New York Giants), 6 to 5.

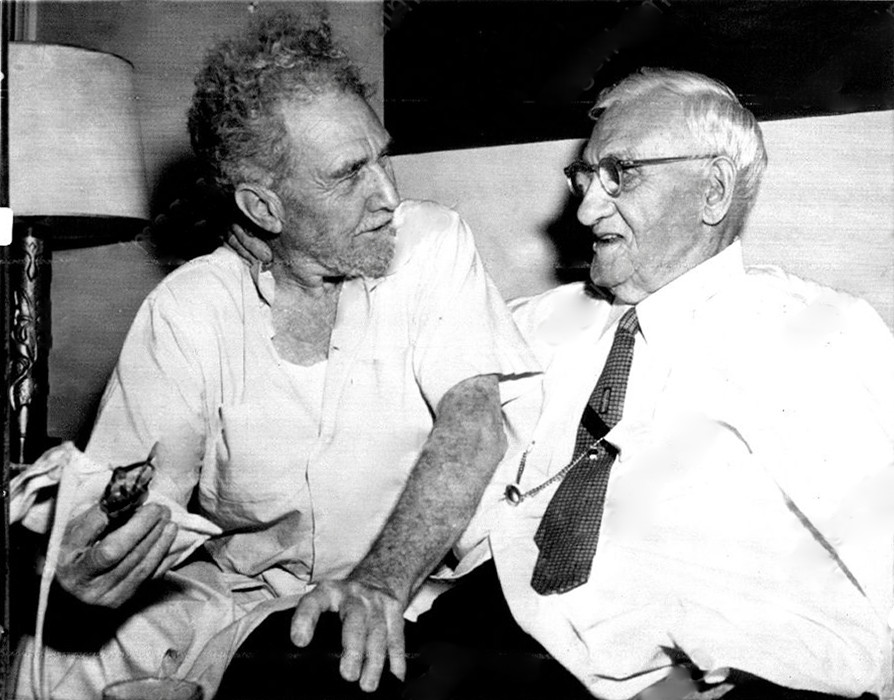
Pound, with U.S. Congressman Usher Burdick, after his release

- All charges of treason against 72-year-old American poet Ezra Pound were dismissed almost 13 years after Pound's arrest. Pound had been charged because of his pro-Fascist radio broadcasts during World War II from Italy, but his case had never been brought to trial because he was adjudged to be insane. With the consent of the U.S. government, U.S. District Court Judge Bolitha J. Laws dismissed the action after concluding that Pound "would in all likelihood never be mentally competent to stand trial" and because the broadcasts "might have been the result of insanity." Pound had been institutionalized at St. Elizabeths Hospital in Washington, D.C., since being returned to the U.S. in 1945.
- The U.S. Immigration and Naturalization Service (INS) arrested William Heikkila, a native of Finland who had lived in the United States since shortly after his birth 52 years earlier, and, without a hearing or notice to his wife, flew him to Canada and then deported him to Finland. Heikkila was arrested in San Francisco as he got off from his job as a draftsman, put in a car, and taken to INS offices for immediate deportation. Four days later, public outrage in the U.S. over the manner of the arrest and deportation was so widespread that INS Commissioner Joseph May Swing ordered the immediate return of Heikkila, whom the government had sought to deport since 1947 because of former membership in the U.S. Communist Party. A federal court issued an injunction against Heikkila's permanent deportation until all appeals were exhausted, and although the Board of Immigration upheld his deportation more than a year later, the case was still on appeal when Heikkila died in San Francisco on May 7, 1960.
- Died:
  - General Maurice Gamelin, 85, French Army commander known for winning the First Battle of the Marne in World War One and losing the Battle of France in 1940
  - William Joscelyn Arkell FGS, FRS, 53, British paleontologist and geologist with an expertise on the Jurassic Period, died of a stroke.

== April 19, 1958 (Saturday) ==
- The Pontifical Commission for Latin America was established by Pope Pius XII for matters pertaining to the Roman Catholic Church in Latin America, where 70% of the population was of the Catholic faith. Cardinal Marcello Mimmi, an Italian cleric and the Archbishop of Naples, was appointed as the commission's first president.
- Died: Billy Meredith, 83, Welsh soccer football star with 48 appearances for the Wales National Team

== April 20, 1958 (Sunday) ==
- The Montreal Canadiens won their third consecutive Stanley Cup, emblematic of the championship of North America's National Hockey League, defeating the Boston Bruins, 5 to 3, in Game Six of the Stanley Cup Finals.
- Died: Frank Mandel, 73, American playwright known for Non, No, Nanette

== April 21, 1958 (Monday) ==
- All 47 persons aboard United Airlines Flight 736 were killed, along with the two-man crew of a U.S. Air Force F-100F jet fighter, when the two planes collided at an altitude of 21,000 feet (6,400 m) shortly after passing over Las Vegas. The United plane, a Douglas DC-7, had taken off from Los Angeles and was en route to Denver in a multi-stop flight with a final scheduled destination of Washington, DC. The jet had taken off from Nellis Air Force Base in Las Vegas on a training flight and was making its descent.
- The government of the Soviet Union announced that at some point before September 1959, the work day in underground mines would be reduced to six hours and the day in other heavy industry factories would be shortened to seven hours a day. The decree was signed by the Soviet Council of Ministers, the Central Committee of the Communist Party and the Central Trade Unions Council.
- Dom Mintoff announced his resignation after three years as Prime Minister of Malta, at the time still a British colony, along with that of his cabinet after a breakdown in talks over independence for the Mediterranean Island. After Malta's independence in 1964, Mintoff would return as the nation's prime minister in 1971.
- Born: Andie MacDowell (Rosalie Anderson MacDowell), American film actor; in Gaffney, South Carolina

== April 22, 1958 (Tuesday) ==
The flag of the Federation

- The independence of the West Indies Federation from Britain was proclaimed at a ceremony in Port of Spain on the island of Trinidad, as Princess Margaret, the younger sister of Queen Elizabeth II, inaugurated the members of the new Federal Parliament, a bicameral legislature for the short-lived opened for the 45 members of the House of Representatives and the 19 members of the Senate, including the Caribbean archipelago's first Prime Minister, Grantley Herbert Adams. The nation, composed of 10 British Caribbean Island Territories, would last for only four years, breaking up in 1962, and the former Federation members would become the separate independent nations of Antigua and Barbuda, Barbados, Dominica, Grenada, Jamaica, Saint Kitts and Nevis, Saint Lucia, Saint Vincent and the Grenadines, and Trinidad and Tobago.
- Vice-Admiral Ram Dass Katari became the first native of India to commander in chief of the Indian Navy, after having been promoted from being the first native Chief of the Naval Staff. His two predecessors, Stephen Hope Carlill and Mark Pizey, had both been born in England.
- Elgin Baylor of the University of Seattle, who had been the most valuable player of the NCAA basketball finals despite Seattle's loss to Kentucky, was the first pick of the 1958 NBA draft. He was selected by the Minneapolis Lakers, who had finished with 19 wins and 53 losses, the worst record of the 1957–58 season.
- Died: Bucky O'Connor, 44, head basketball coach of the University of Iowa Hawkeyes, was killed in an automobile accident near Waterloo, Iowa, when his car was crushed by the cargo of a truck that he had swerved into.

== April 23, 1958 (Wednesday) ==
- The first test of the Thor-Able rocket system, a hybrid of parts of the part of the U.S. Air Force's first ballistic missile (PGM-17 Thor) and the Able rocket stage used on Vanguard missiles, ended in failure 2 minutes and 15 seconds after its launch. The missile was intended to travel 6,325 miles (10,179 km) to a point near the island of Saint Helena in the south Atlantic Ocean but went less than 700 miles (1,100 km) The rocket exploded at an altitude of 50 miles (80 km), short of the height defined as the start of outer space and its animal cargo, a mouse inside the nose cone, was lost in the Atlantic Ocean rather than making a sub-orbital flight.
- A U.S. Army mass jump of 1,300 paratroopers of the 101st Airborne Division saw five soldiers killed and 137 injured when the high winds began partway through the operation in Fort Campbell, Kentucky. The exercise was the largest since World War II.
- The Good Soldier Schweik, an opera based on Jaroslav Hašek's 1921 novel The Good Soldier Švejk, was performed for the first time, premiered by the New York City Opera at the City Center Theater. Its composer, Robert Kurka, had died of leukemia four months earlier and had worked on completing the opera during his illness."
- Wojciech Kilar's Symphony No. 2 was premiered by the Polish National Radio Symphony Orchestra in Katowice.
- The musical Expresso Bongo, a "satire of the music industry", premiered at London's West End at the Saville Theatre.

== April 24, 1958 (Thursday) ==
Lleras Camargo, Liberal and Conservative

- Alberto Lleras Camargo agreed to accept the nomination of both political parties in the South American nation of Colombia to serve as the new president to succeed the five-man military junta that had overthrown dictator Gustavo Rojas Pinilla. Under the terms of the 1956 agreement between the Colombian Liberal Party (PLC) and the Colombian Conservative Party (PCC), an equal number of seats were reserved in both houses of the Congress of Colombia for the two parties, and the presidency would alternate every four years, with the Conservatives to select the 1958 president, subject to the approval of the Liberals, and for the 1962 president to be picked by the Liberals. Since a majority of the Conservatives did not approve of their moderate member, Guillermo Leon Valencia (who would have been acceptable to the Liberals), the parties amended their agreement to let Lleras Camargo, Director of the Liberal Party, to serve first, with the Conservatives to pick the 1962 candidate. Dr. Lleras resigned from the Liberals in his acceptance speech and said, "I consider myself obligated to represent both parties equally."
- The Presidium of the Soviet Union adopted a law to allow criminal prosecution of factory managers who failed to meet their production quotas or failed to fill obligations for delivery of goods to customers, noting in the resolution that laxness was "a flagrant violation of state discipline" and providing for fines of up to three months salary for the first offense, and jail for the second one.
- After forming a cabinet, Sim Var became Prime Minister of Cambodia for the second time in a year, replacing Penn Nouth, who had quit when parliament was dissolved in March to hold new elections. Sim Var had been Prime Minister at the beginning of 1958, stepping down on January 11.
- Born: Steve Wright, English serial killer known as "The Suffolk Strangler", who murdered five prostitutes in Ipswich over a period of six weeks in late 2006; in Erpingham, Norfolk
- Died: Abderrahmane Taleb, 28, Algerian FLN munitions expert who created the explosives used in FLN bombings on French establishments, was executed by guillotine at the Barberousse Prison in Algiers.

== April 25, 1958 (Friday) ==
- In what was later called the "Xunhua Incident" by the Chinese Communist Party, two regiments of China's People's Liberation Army (PLA) fired into a crowd of 4,000 minority protesters in the Xunhua Salar Autonomous County, killing 435 of them. The PLA said that 17 of its soldiers had been killed in the fighting. Soldiers arrested 2,500 people, mostly Salars, along with a lesser number of Tibetans, Hui people and some sympathetic members of the majority Han Chinese group that constituted 92 percent of the citizens of China.
- Japan's Prime Minister Nobusuke Kishi dissolved the 467-member Chamber of Deputies after the Socialist Party moved for a vote of no confidence. Kishi set an election date of May 22 for the Deputies in the first nationwide election in Japan since 1955.
- Playing in Moscow, Leningrad and Tbilisi, the American male basketball players won all six of its games and the women finished with a 4 and 2 record, and as part of the cultural agreement, two Soviet teams were scheduled to tour the United States starting on February 1, 1959.
- A series of six basketball games matching the men's and women's teams of the United States against opponents in the Soviet Union began in Moscow, where an overflow crowd of 17,000 fans watched at the Lozhniki Sports Palace. Both American teams were formed by the champions of the Amateur Athletic Union men's and women's tournaments. In the opener the women's U.S. team, made primarily from students of the Nashville Business College and coached by John L. Head, lost 61–46 to the Soviet team. The men's U.S.A. team was made up of the Peoria (Illinois) Cats and supplemented by other AAU players. After trailing 31 to 40 at halftime, the men made a comeback and beat the Soviets, 74 to 68.
- Born: Luis Guillermo Solís, President of Costa Rica 2014 to 2018; in San José, Costa Rica

== April 26, 1958 (Saturday) ==
- With the support of the United States Central Intelligence Agency, a force of rebels in Indonesia, commanded by Ventje Sumual, captured the Indonesian Air Force base on the island of Morotai as the first stage of what Sumual called Operation Jakarta.
- Reino Kuuskoski became the new Prime Minister of Finland upon the resignation of Rainer von Fieandt.
- Mr. and Mrs. Frank Sitar, a couple from Hopkins, Minnesota, discovered the body of seven-year-old murder victim Maria Ridulph 2.5 miles (4.0 km) east of Woodbine, Illinois. The child had disappeared on December 3, 1957. After a wrongful conviction in 2012 and the suspect's exoneration in 2017, the murder remains unsolved.
- Born: Giancarlo Esposito, Danish-born American TV actor; in Copenhagen

== April 27, 1958 (Sunday) ==
- Parliamentary elections were held in the African colony of French Togoland for the National Assembly in preparation for independence (which would be achieved in 1960 as the Republic of Togo). The Committee of Togolese Unity, a pro-independence organization which had been deterred from participation in the previous election, won a majority with 29 of the 46 seats, and its leader, Sylvanus Olympio, became the colony's Prime Minister.
- The Soviet Union attempted to launch its third Sputnik satellite into orbit, but the R-7 rocket failed. Sputnik 3 would be launched on May 15.
- In the largest battle up to that time in the Algerian War, French Army troops killed 215 FLN insurgents in an attack on the hilltop village of Catinat, near Settara and about 33 miles (53 km) northwest of the city of Constantine.
- U.S. Vice President Richard M. Nixon and his wife, Pat, began an ill-fated 18-day goodwill tour of South America, stopping over first to Port of Spain in Trinidad before embarking the next day to Uruguay.

== April 28, 1958 (Monday) ==
- Eighteen Indonesian Navy sailors on the KRI Hang Tuah were killed and another 28 injured in a bombing carried out by the U.S. Central Intelligence Agency (CIA). William H. Beale, a CIA operative pilot, dropped bombs from a B-26 bomber and sank the Hang Tuah as part of the agency's support of the Permesta rebellion against the government of President Sukarno. Other bombs struck and sank the oil tanker SS San Flaviano, although all crew were able to evacuate safely but failed to bomb the tanker MV Daronia.
- The United Kingdom exploded its largest nuclear weapon ever, a three megaton hydrogen bomb dropped near Christmas Island in the South Pacific Ocean, as the "Y" test of Operation Grapple.
- The United States carried out the first of the 35 nuclear tests (over a period of 16 weeks) of Operation Hardtack I, starting with the high altitude "Yucca" test over the Pacific Ocean. A 1.7 kiloton bomb was sent to an altitude of 86,000 feet (16.3 mi) or 26.2 kilometers by a large balloon and then detonated for research on the effect on electronics by a nuclear electromagnetic pulse or EMP.
- The U.S. attempt to launch a fourth orbiting satellite, Vanguard TV-5 (TV standing for "test vehicle"), failed five minutes after liftoff when the third stage failed to separate from the Vanguard rocket. After launching from Cape Canaveral at 9:53 local time (0253 UTC 29 April) the spacecraft reached an altitude of 358 miles (576 km) and then fell back earthward, crashing in the sea 1,600 miles (2,600 km) from the launch site.
- The city of Southfield, Michigan, was incorporated from a section of the Southfield Township to prevent its annexation by neighboring Detroit.

== April 29, 1958 (Tuesday) ==
- The Convention on the High Seas, an international treaty to set a uniform law for causes of action that take place in international waters outside of the jurisdiction of any nation, was signed in Geneva by the representations of 16 nations. It entered into force on September 30, 1962, after ratification by 25 nations.
- The Convention on Fishing and Conservation of the Living Resources of the High Seas was signed in Geneva and entered into force on March 20, 1966.
- The government of the United Arab Republic signed an accord with representatives of stockholders of the Universal Suez Canal Company for payment of compensation arising from Egypt's 1956 nationalization of the Suez Canal. Egypt agreed to pay 28,300,000 Egyptian pounds (equivalent to $81,000,000 U.S. dollars) to the owners of the canal. On May 1, the U.S. ended a freeze, made in 1956, of the assets of Egyptian government and of the Suez Canal Company held in U.S. banks.
- King Farouk of Egypt, who had been deposed in 1952 after having ruled the nation for 16 years, was stripped of his Egyptian citizenship.
- James Cash Penney, the 83-year-old founder of the JCPenney chain of department stores (1,689 at the time), announced his retirement as chairman of the board and the installment of former company president Albert W. Hughes.
- Allen B. DuMont, founder of the DuMont Television Network and the inventor of the cathode ray tube used in the first practical televisions, received a patent for another TV invention that would never be put into use, the "Du Mont Duoscopic" set, which would allow two programs to be telecast simultaneously to the same set, with polarizer panels to allow different viewers to choose which of two programs to watch, and earpieces to hear separate shows. The application for the "Dual image viewing apparatus" had been made on January 11, 1954, and was granted U.S. patent number 2,532,821.
- Born:
  - Michelle Pfeiffer, American film and TV actress; in Santa Ana, California
  - Ramachandra Guha, Indian historian; in Dehradun, Uttarakhand

== April 30, 1958 (Wednesday) ==
- The TV station Moldova 1 began broadcasting in Romania and is now the national station of the Republic of Moldova.
- TV broadcasting began in southern Russia on the day after the completion of the Rostov TV tower at Rostov-on-Don.
- The Lerner and Loewe musical My Fair Lady was first shown in the United Kingdom as it made its West End theatre premiere at Drury Lane. The musical ran with the original stars of the 1956 Broadway premiere reprising their roles, bringing back Rex Harrison as Professor Higgins and Julie Andrews as Eliza Doolittle, along with Stanley Holloway and Robert Coote.
- The U.S. Navy conducted an experiment to determine how high a basketball would bounce if dropped from the top of the Empire State Building. Because of the danger in doing the test from the New York City skyscraper, a U.S. Navy blimp hovered over its Lakehurst (New Jersey) base at 1,472 feet (449 m), the altitude of the building's television tower, and dropped 12 basketballs as closely as possible to a target on a runway. "This is no frivolous stunt," Lieutenant Commander John Hannigan told reporters, adding "Continual developments of our bombing accuracy for anti-submarine missions demand constant practice in dropping missiles with varying ballistics." The test showed that a basketball dropped from the Empire State Building would bounce back up no higher than twenty-two feet nine inches (6.93 meters).
- Died: George Everard Shotton, 78, former British marine engineer who had been the prime suspect in the 1919 disappearance of his wife, Mamie Stuart, but who was only convicted of bigamy because her body could not be found. The body would be located three years later, on November 5, 1961.
