= March 1958 =

Month of 1958

<<	March 1958					>>
Su	Mo	Tu	We	Th	Fr	Sa
						1
2	3	4	5	6	7	8
9	10	11	12	13	14	15
16	17	18	19	20	21	22
23	24	25	26	27	28	29
30	31

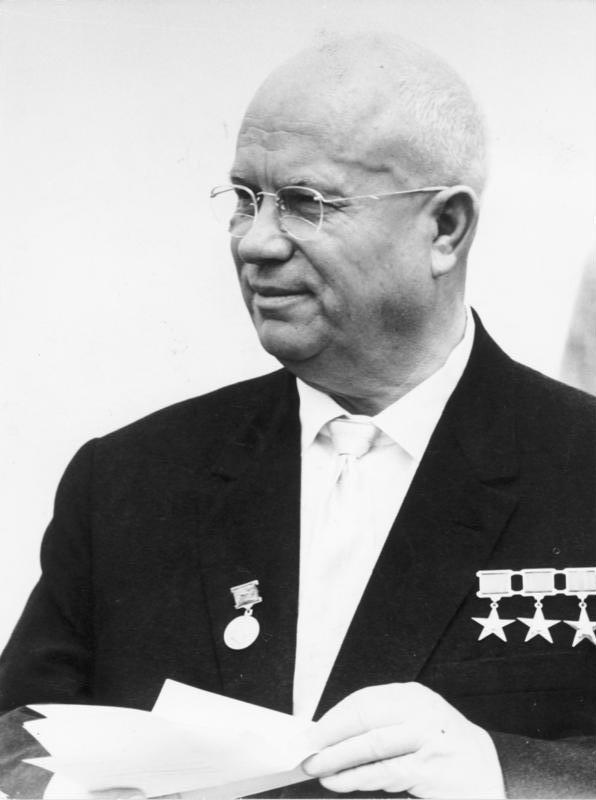
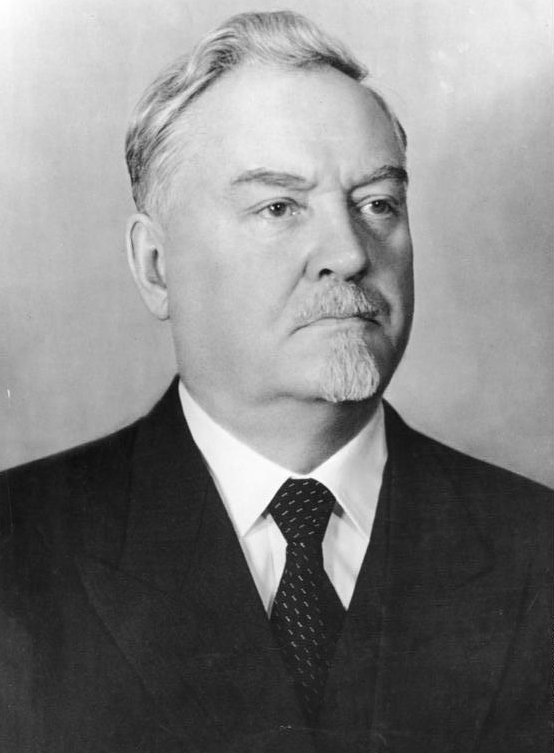
March 27, 1958: Soviet Communist Party boss Nikita Khrushchev consolidates power, replaces Nikolai Bulganin as head of government

The following events occurred in March 1958:

== March 1, 1958 (Saturday) ==
- At least 300 people died when the Turkish passenger ship Üsküdar capsized and sank in the Gulf of İzmit. The ship was carrying 370 paid passengers and a crew of 20 when it overturned during a sudden gale. About three-fourths of the passengers were high school and junior college students who went to school in Izmit and who would ride the noon ferry on Saturdays in order to spend the weekend at their family's homes in Gölcük on the other side of the Gulf. The ferry operator disclosed later in the day that in addition to the 370 passengers who had bought tickets, there were between 100 and 150 additional persons who had come aboard using transit passes bought earlier; the capacity of the Üsküdar was limited to 350 people.
- In Uruguay, the nine-member Consejo Nacional that served as the executive branch for the South American nation, held its annual meeting to select one of its members as the President of Uruguay. Carlos Fischer, the former Minister of Agriculture, was picked to succeed Arturo Lezama and would serve until March 1, 1959.
- In Japan, All Nippon Airways (ANA) was created by the merger of FarEastern Airways of Japan and Nippon Helicopter Transport.
- Died: Giacomo Balla, 86, Italian Futurist painter

== March 2, 1958 (Sunday) ==
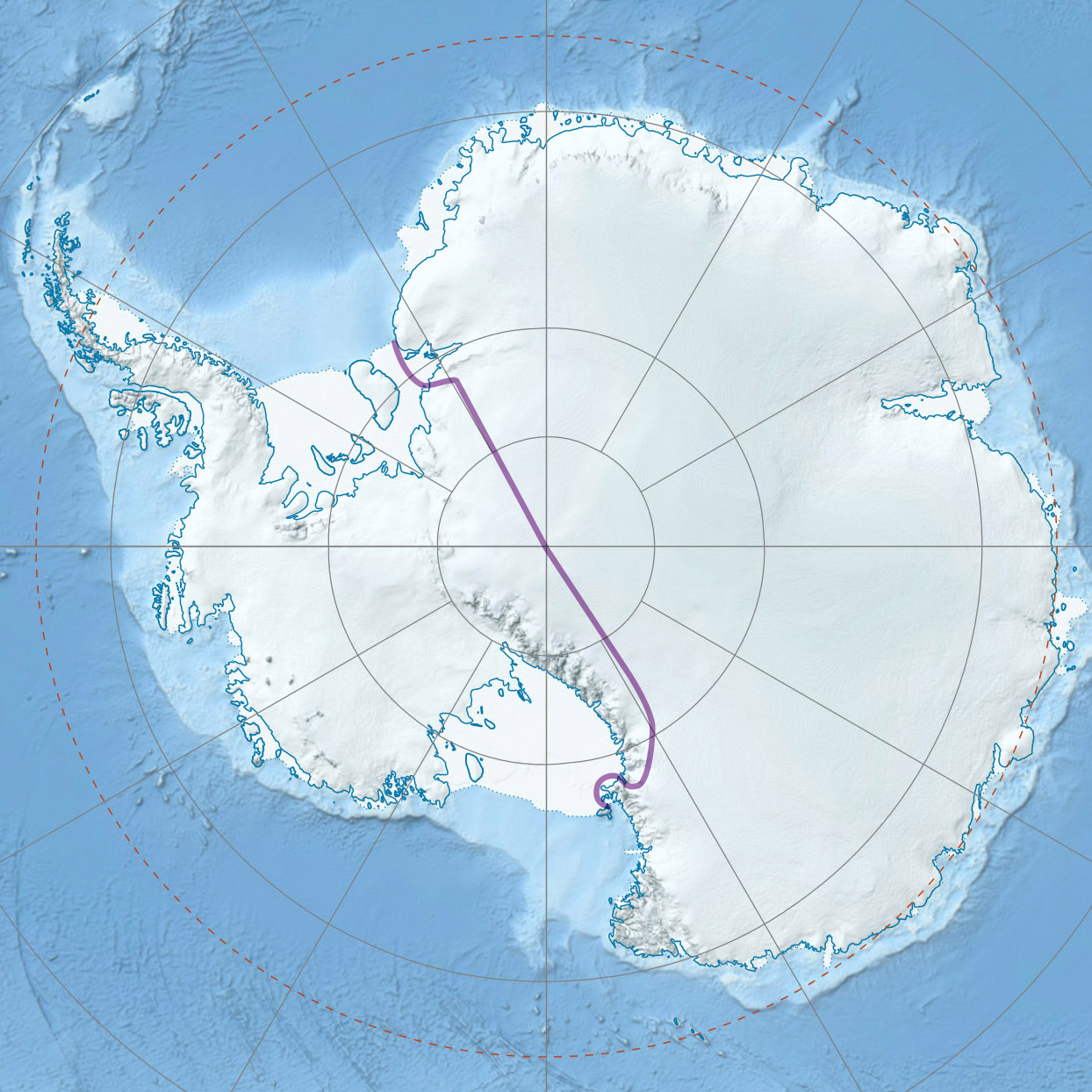
The expedition's south to north route over Antarctica

- The British Commonwealth Trans-Antarctic Expedition team, led by Sir Vivian Fuchs, completed the first overland crossing of the Antarctic, using snowcat caterpillar tractors and dogsled teams, in 99 days, via the South Pole. Fuchs had set off from the British base at Vahsel Bay of the Weddell Sea (south of Chile) on November 24, reached the South Pole on January 19 and then proceeded to the Scott Station at McMurdo Sound (south of New Zealand), arriving at 1:47 a.m. local time.
- Greece's Prime Minister Konstantinos Karamanlis announced his resignation after 15 parliament members announced that they would resign from his National Radical Union (Ethniki Rizospastiki Enosis) party, ending the 164-seat majority that the NRU had held in the 300-seat Hellenic Parliament. Two members of his cabinet, the Minister of Trade and the Minister of Public Works, resigned and Karmanalis asked that King Paul dissolve parliament and call a new election. The next day, King Paul appointed Konstantinos Georgakopoulos as Prime Minister of a caretaker government. Elections would be held on May 11, 1958 and increase the majority for the NRU, with Karmanalis returning as Prime Minister.

== March 3, 1958 (Monday) ==
- Richard A. Mack, one of the five commissioners on the Federal Communications Commission that regulated all broadcasting in the United States, was forced to resign after having been accused of accepting money to award a television station license to a friend in Miami. The charges had come to light in testimony before the U.S. House of Representatives Legislative Oversight Committee. Mack was indicted by a federal grand jury, along with bribe payer Thurman A. Whiteside, on September 25. Charges against Mack would eventually be dropped because of his declining health.
- General Nuri al-Said agreed to return to his previous position as Prime Minister of Iraq after Prime Minister Abdul-Wahab Mirjan was asked by King Faisal II to resign. General Said had resigned in June because of illness. He and the King would both be assassinated in a coup d'etat on July 15.
- The U.S. Supreme Court ruled, 8 to 1, that the U.S. Army did not have the authority to give a less than honorable discharge, premised solely on subversive activities that took place before their induction, to a person who had been drafted into the military. The Court also declined to review a decision by the Fourth Circuit Court of Appeals that had found that Prince Edward County, Virginia had failed to follow the 1954 decision in Brown v. Board of Education and that the county was failing to make a "prompt and reasonable start" to end racial segregation of schools. After the Brown decision, Prince Edward County's supervisors had voted not to operate any public schools and to let education be handled by private schools funded by pledges and tuition. The Attorney General of Virginia had filed a petition for review on behalf of the county.
- Seven coal miners were killed in the Netherlands at the state-owned Staatsmijn Maurits coal mine near Geleen.
- Born: Miranda Richardson, English film actress, Golden Globe and BAFTA winner; in Southport, Lancashire
- Died: Wilhelm Zaisser, 65, former East German official who served as that nation's first director of its secret police agency, the Stasi (Staatssicherheitsdienst or State Security Service). Zaisser also fought in the Spanish Civil War under the nom-de-guerre "General Gomez". He was removed from his position by the ruling Communist party, the SED, in 1953 on charges of failing to use sufficient force to prevent the uprising by East German workers, and later dropped from the party on charges of "forming a faction... with a defeatist line directed against the unity of the Party."

== March 4, 1958 (Tuesday) ==
- A ceasefire agreement between the Greek Cypriot paramilitary organization EOKA, and the British government that administered Cyprus at the time, was broken with new attacks by EOKA against colonial buildings.
- Born: Patricia Heaton, American comedian, TV actress and 3-time Emmy Award winner known as the star of The Middle and supporting actress on Everybody Loves Raymond; in Bay Village, Ohio

== March 5, 1958 (Wednesday) ==
- Luhansk, a city in the Ukrainian SSR that had been renamed Voroshilovgrad in 1935 in honor of Defense Minister Kliment Voroshilov, was restored to its original name after a decree by Soviet leader Nikita Khrushchev that cities could not be named after living persons. At the time, Voroshilov was the Chairman of the Presidium of the Supreme Soviet and the nominal head of state of the U.S.S.R.; upon Voroshilov's death in 1969, the name of Luhansk would be changed again to Voroshilovgrad and then back to Luhansk in 1990.
- Explorer 2 was launched from Cape Canaveral, at 1:27 p.m. local time (18:27 UTC), with a payload of an 80-inch (2,000 mm) cylinder, similar to that of Explorer 1, launched six weeks earlier. Contact with the Explorer 2 was lost a few minutes after liftoff, and the U.S. Army's team announced the next day that the second Explorer had failed to reach orbit after the final stage of the Jupiter rocket failed to ignite at an altitude of 200 miles (320 km). The satellite burned up on re-entry to the atmosphere over the Caribbean Sea.
- Born:
  - Andy Gibb, English pop singer and stage actor; in Stretford, Lancashire (d. 1988)
  - Nassar (stage name for Muhammad Hanif), Indian film star; in Palur, Tamil Nadu state (at the time, Madras State)

== March 6, 1958 (Thursday) ==
- North Korea released the 26 passengers and crew who had been on a Korean National Airlines plane hijacked on February 16. On the same day, anti-aircraft artillery from the north side of the Korean Demilitarized Zone shot down a U.S. Air Force F-86 Sabrejet that had strayed into North Korean airspace during a training mission.
- U.S. President Dwight D. Eisenhower gave approval to Operation Argus, a series of low-yield, high-atmosphere nuclear weapons tests and missile tests to test the Christofilos effect, the theory of nuclear physicist Nicholas Christofilos that the explosion of nuclear weapons in the Earth's magnetic field would create large electrical currents that could destroy the electronic systems of enemy missiles. The Argus tests, which would be secretly conducted over the South Atlantic Ocean starting on August 27, 1958, and continuing to September 9, demonstrated that the disruption created by the Christofilos effect could disable the electronics of radar systems and satellites, but was not strong enough to damage missiles.

== March 7, 1958 (Friday) ==
- Catholic University of Argentina (Universidad Católica Argentina or UCA) was founded as a private university. Sixty years after its founding, it would have an enrollment of 18,000 students on six campuses.
- "The Sharpshooter", a pilot for a TV series, was telecast as the week's offering on Zane Grey Theatre on CBS. The telecast, which featured Chuck Connors and Johnny Crawford as a father and son moving to a new town, was popular enough to be picked up in the fall on the ABC network as the series The Rifleman.
- Born:
  - Rik Mayall, English comedian and TV actor; in Matching Tye, Essex (d. 2014)
  - Gregory Markkanen, American politician and member of the Michigan House of Representatives since 2019

== March 8, 1958 (Saturday) ==
- Television was introduced to the Kazakh SSR, now the Republic of Kazakhstan, as Gostelradio Kazkh began broadcasting.
- The Kingdom of Yemen joined the United Arab Republic (UAR), formed in February by the merger of Egypt and Syria, as Yemeni Crown Prince Saif al-Islam Mohammed al-Badr came to Cairo and, with the UAR's President Gamel Abdel Nasser, signed the documents necessary to join the federation. For purposes of providing for Yemen's Imam Ahmad bin Yahya to continue as absolute monarch there, the name of the nation was announced as the "United Arab States".
- The USS Wisconsin was decommissioned, leaving the United States Navy without an active battleship for the first time since 1895, as the U.S. completed the shift of its warships to aircraft carriers and submarines. John O. Miner, captain of the battleship Wisconsin, formally delivered the vessel to the New York Group of the U.S. Navy's Atlantic Reserve Fleet at Bayonne, New Jersey. By 1958, the United Kingdom's Royal Navy had no active battleships and the Soviet Union's navy had one. USS Wisconsin would later be recommissioned on October 22, 1988.
- Born: Gary Numan (stage name for Gary Webb), English electronic musician; in London

== March 9, 1958 (Sunday) ==
- The Kanmon Roadway Tunnel, at 3.461 kilometres (2.151 mi) the longest undersea highway tunnel in the world at the time, was opened to traffic to connect the Japanese islands of Honshu and Kyushu beneath the Kanmon Straits in the Sea of Japan. The tunnel allowed driving between the city of Shimonoseki (on Honshu) and the town of Moji (which would later be consolidated with four other towns to create the city of Kitakyushu) on Kyushu.

== March 10, 1958 (Monday) ==
- The Sacred Congregation of the Council of the Vatican announced the excommunication from the Roman Catholic Church of three priests in Hungary who had become members of the Communist-dominated Parliament of Hungary, in violations of a decree against participation in politics made the previous July. Richard Horvath, Nicholas Beresztoczy and Janos Mate were barred from administering the sacraments to Catholic worshipers.
- The National Advisory Committee for Aeronautics (NACA), predecessor to NASA, presented its report on "recoverable crewed satellite" configurations— the launching of an American astronaut into space. One involved a blunt, high-drag, zero-lift vehicle that would depend on a parachute landing for final deceleration. Another was a winged vehicle that would glide to a landing after reentering the atmosphere. The third proposal was a combination of the two.
- A working conference in support of the Air Force "Man in Space Soonest" (MISS) program began at the Air Force Ballistic Missile Division in Los Angeles. General Bernard Schriever told the crowd that events were moving more quickly than expected, in that the Soviet Union was also making progress on its goal to put the first man into outer space. The U.S. Air Force concept consisted of three stages: a high-drag, no-lift, blunt-shaped spacecraft, with landing to be accomplished by a parachute; a more sophisticated approach by possibly employing a lifting vehicle or one with a modified drag; and a long-range program that might lead to creating a space station or a trip to the Moon.
- Born:
  - Carol Johnston, Canadian gymnast who competed at the collegiate level despite having been born without a right hand; in Calgary (d. 2019)
  - Frankie Ruiz, American Latino singer; in Paterson, New Jersey (d. 1998)
  - Sharon Stone, American film actress; in Meadville, Pennsylvania

== March 11, 1958 (Tuesday) ==
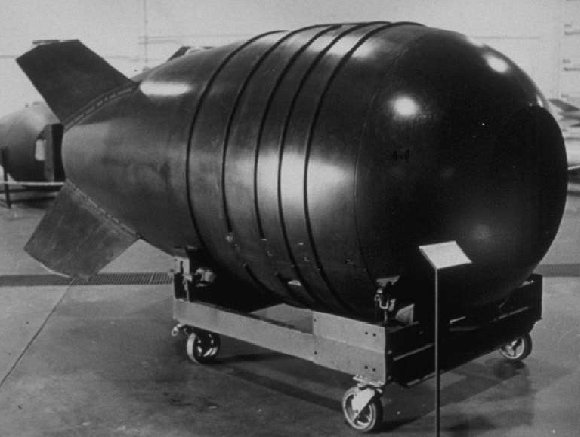
An Mk-6 atomic bomb

- A U.S. B-47 bomber accidentally dropped an unarmed Mk-6 atomic bomb on a farm at Mars Bluff, South Carolina, five miles (8 km) east of the city of Florence. Although there was no danger of a nuclear explosion, the conventional TNT explosives within the bomb were inadvertently detonated on impact, hurting six people. The United Press news service commented that "It was the first time an atomic bomb was known to have been dropped in the United States outside nuclear testing grounds." The explosion demolished the home of the farm owner, Walter Gregg, and injured him, his wife and three children, and a niece. The blast left a crater 75 feet (23 m) in diameter and 35 feet (11 m) deep in his yard. The Strategic Air Command issued a statement afterward that "Mechanical malfunction of the plane's bomb lock caused the four-jet B-47 to let go of the bomb."
- Died: Ole Kirk Christiansen, 66, Danish toymaker who founded The Lego Group in 1932 as a maker of wooden toys and later moved to acrylonitrile butadiene styrene plastic toys that would become his company's billion-dollar product

== March 12, 1958 (Wednesday) ==
- The Army of Indonesia began a nationwide offensive on the island of Sumatra against the rebel Revolutionary Government (PRRI) rebellion, starting with a defeat of the PRRI in a battle at Pekanbaru to prevent the destruction of the Caltex oil fields and refinery.
- In Cuba, the regime of President Fulgencio Batista announced the suspension of constitutional rights across the entire nation, with censorship of all media in order "to adopt special measures to maintain public order", according to a statement from Batista's office. He asked Prime Minister Emilio Núñez Portuondo, who had taken office only six days earlier, to resign along with the entire cabinet of members, and replaced him with Gonzalo Güell. The action came one day after constitutional guarantees had been restored in the Oriente Province, where Fidel Castro's guerrilla operation was most active.
- The 26th of July Movement, Fidel Castro's guerrilla organization, issued the "Manifiesto Del Movimiento 26 De Julio Al Pueblo", its manifesto of a declaration of a "total war on tyranny". Castro called on Cubans to boycott the upcoming November 3 presidential and legislative elections and threatened that people who participated ran the risk of being killed.
- The NACA staff completed its outline for the "manned satellite program", based on a study of reaching orbit, orbit control, reviewing space limitations, configuration studies, propulsion system research, human factors, structures and materials, satellite instrumentation, range requirements, and noise and vibration during reentry and exit. The program would start with full-scale studies of mockups, simulators, and detail designs, followed by full-scale vertical and orbiting flights involving uncrewed, animal, and crewed flights and recovery, and a goal of increasing the mass of payloads. NACA concluded that the Atlas missile was adequate to reach orbital flights; that retrograde and vernier controllable thrust could be used for orbital control; that heat-sink or lighter material could be used against reentry heating; that guidance should be ground-programmed with provisions for the pilot to make final adjustments; that recovery should be accomplished at sea with parachutes used for letdown; that a global network of radar stations should be established for continuous tracking; and that launches be made from Cape Canaveral in Florida.
- Maurice Stokes, the 1956 NBA Rookie of the Year and a forward for the Cincinnati Royals (now the Sacramento Kings), suffered a brain injury when he was knocked down during a 96-89 win over the Minneapolis Lakers. After being revived, he returned to play, finishing with 24 points. Three days later, Stokes suffered a seizure after a playoff game and was left permanently paralyzed.

== March 13, 1958 (Thursday) ==
- A group of 7,000 members of the police force of Paris began a demonstration in the courtyard of the police headquarters. On encouragement from an extremist member of parliament, Jean-Marie Le Pen, about 2,000 of the police attempted to enter the Palais Bourbon, where the French National Assembly held its sessions. The next day, a new chief of police, Maurice Papon, was named to restore order to replace Prefect Andre Lahillonne.
- John Aiken of Arlington, Massachusetts, played his first and only National Hockey League game, after being called out of the stands at the Boston Garden where he was a spectator. Under NHL rules at the time, each team had an employee whose job was to tend goal during practices, with the added duty of coming in as an "emergency goalie" during regular games if the goaltender for either team was injured. In the second period, Montreal Canadiens' goaltender Jacques Plante suffered a skull fracture and Aiken was ordered to substitute. Entering when the Boston Bruins were leading 1 to 0, Aiken made 12 saves but six goals got past him and Boston won, 7 to 3.
- Nathan Leopold, who helped kidnap and murder 14-year-old Bobby Franks in 1924, walked out of Stateville Correctional Center in Illinois after serving 33½ years of his "life plus 99 years" sentence. Leopold's partner in crime, Richard Loeb, had been killed by a fellow inmate at the state penitentiary in Joliet in 1936.

== March 14, 1958 (Friday) ==
- The Recording Industry Association of America (RIAA) introduced the concept of recognition as a "gold record" for any U.S. music recording that had achieved at least $1,000,000 in retail sales and certified the 45 rpm recording by Perry Como of "Catch a Falling Star" as the first RIAA-measured gold record. While record labels had previously presented gold or silver record awards to their own artists as far back as 1937, the RIAA applied the award to all U.S.-based recording companies.
- The United States imposed an embargo on sales of weapons to the government of Cuba's dictator Fulgencio Batista, contributing significantly to the deterioration of the Cuban resistance to the rebellion led by Fidel Castro.
- Former U.S. President Harry S. Truman called a press conference to respond to recent criticism of him by the city council of the Japanese city of Hiroshima, which had been struck by a U.S. atomic bomb on Truman's authorization on August 6, 1945. Truman read aloud a letter he had sent the day before to Hiroshima's mayor, Tsukasa Nitoguri, and said, "Your courteous letter... was greatly appreciated. The feeling of the people of your city is easily understood, and I am not in any way offended by the resolution which their City Council passed. However, it becomes necessary for me to remind the City Council, and perhaps you also, of some historical events." He went on to say, "As the executive who ordered the dropping of the bomb, I think the sacrifice of Hiroshima and Nagasaki was urgent and necessary for the prospective welfare of both Japan and the Allies. The need for such a fateful decision, of course, never would have arisen had we not been shot in the back by Japan at Pearl Harbor in December, 1941."
- Born:
  - Albert II, Prince of Monaco and that European nation's reigning monarch since 2005, was born to Princess Grace (former American actress Grace Kelly) and the nation's ruler, Prince Ranier III, at the Prince's Palace in Monte Carlo.
  - Bruno Dumont, French film director and screenwriter; in Bailleul, département du Nord

== March 15, 1958 (Saturday) ==
- Beijing Wanbao, an afternoon tabloid newspaper for general news in the People's Republic of China, began publication as a periodical regulated by, but not affiliated with, the Chinese Communist Party.
- After scoring 12 points in an NBA playoff game in Detroit, Cincinnati Royals forward Maurice Stokes was stricken with encephalitis after a severe concussion sustained in a game in Minneapolis three days earlier and lapsed into a coma. Stokes would emerge from his coma but be permanently paralyzed, and would die at the age of 36 in 1970.
- The University of Denver Pioneers won the 1958 NCAA Men's Ice Hockey Tournament#NCAA Ice Hockey championship with a 6 to 2 victory over the North Dakota Fighting Sioux (now the Fighting Hawks) at Williams Arena in Minneapolis.

== March 16, 1958 (Sunday) ==
- Elections were held in the South American nation of Colombia for both houses of the Congress, the 148-member Cámara de Representantes and the 80-member Senado, the first free election since 1949 and the first under the National Front agreement of June 24, 1956, which allocated the seats equally among the two legal political parties, the Liberals and the Conservatives. The multi-candidate primary elections were contested for the available allocated seats, and the outcome of the voting for the Conservatives would affect the choice for the next president, who was to be a Conservative under the 1956 agreement. Right-wing Conservative Party candidates won the majority of the seats allotted to the Party but their leader, former President Laureano Gomez, declined to be selected as president and opposed the moderate Conservative candidate, Guillermo Leon Valencia, who would have been accepted by the Liberals, was not favored by the majority of the Conservative Party. On March 31, Gómez endorsed a Liberal, Alberto Lleras as an acceptable replacement on condition that the 1962 President would be a Conservative.
- The quadrennial legislative election in the Soviet Union was conducted to vote yes or no on the slate of unopposed candidates that had been pre-approved by the Communist Party for the Supreme Soviet, with 738 for the Soviet of the Union and 640 for the Soviet of Nationalities. Out of almost 134 million votes, about 581,000 or 0.4% were no votes. Citizens could also vote yes by submitting an unmarked ballot.
- In Italy, the rebuilt Ponte Santa Trinita over the Arno River was rededicated in Florence, almost 14 years after the original 16th century bridge had been destroyed by retreating German troops during World War II. A reporter for The New York Times noted, "Often referred to as the world's most beautiful bridge, it has been reconstructed 'where it was and how it was,'" with the lobbying and fundraising efforts led by U.S. art historian Bernard Berenson.
- Born:
  - Jorge Ramos, Mexican-American journalist and Emmy Award-winning anchorman for Noticiero Univision, the world's most popular Spanish language news program; in Mexico City.
  - Diop Kamau, African-American civil rights activist and investigator into police misconduct; as Don Jackson in Los Angeles

== March 17, 1958 (Monday) ==
- Italy's President Giovanni Gronchi dissolved the Italian Senate and the Chamber of Deputies and scheduled parliamentary elections for May 25 and May 26.

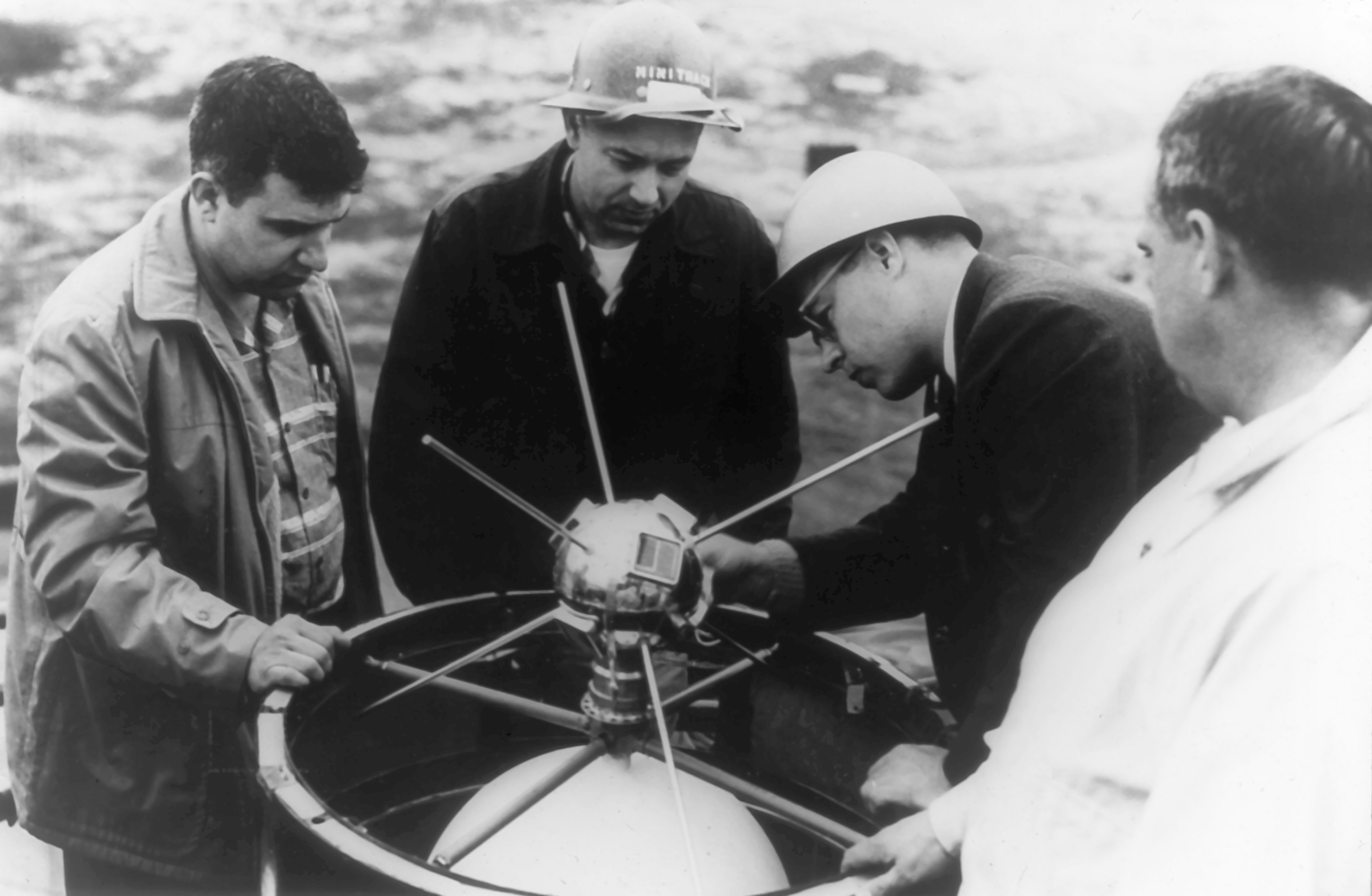
The Vanguard 1 satellite being loaded into the nosecone

- The United States launched the Vanguard 1 satellite into orbit, its second successful orbital launch and the first for the U.S. Navy. The three-stage Saturn rocket lifted off from Cape Canaveral at 7:15 a.m. local time (1215 UTC) and entered an elliptical orbit ranging between 2,513 miles (4,044 km) and 407 miles (655 km) above the Earth, higher than the two satellites in orbit from the Soviet Union or the U.S. Explorer 1. Vanguard 1 was also the smallest of the first four satellites, measuring 6.4 inches (160 mm) in diameter, comparable to a grapefruit and weighing 3.25 pounds (1.47 kg).
- The NACA Special Committee on Space Technology presented its reports from committee working groups. From 1952 and 1956, 10% of NACA's research applied to astronautics. In 1957, it was 23% and by 1958, 30% to the aerodynamic effort and 20% to propulsion.
- The Convention on the Inter-Governmental Maritime Consultative Organization entered into force, creating the International Maritime Organization (IMCO) as a specialized agency of the United Nations.

== March 18, 1958 (Tuesday) ==
- With the Palais Bourbon guarded by troops, France's National Assembly voted for the eleventh time to express confidence in the four-month old government of Prime Minister Felix Gaillard on the issue of constitutional reform. In what was seen as an effort to avoid worsening the ongoing political crisis created by the siege of the parliamentary building five days earlier, Assembly voted 282 to 196 in favor of continuing the Gaillard government.
- The report "Preliminary Studies of Manned Satellites, Wingless Configuration, Non-Lifting", which would become the basic working paper for the Project Mercury development program, was published by NACA after being written by Maxime A. Faget, Benjamine Garland, and James J. Buglia. The same day, the NACA Conference on High-Speed Aerodynamics began to acquaint the military services and industrial contractors of aerospace projects and results of recent research on spaceflight. The 3-day conference was attended by more than 500 people, featured 46 technical papers presented by NACA personnel, and included specific proposals for human spaceflight vehicle projects.
- Born: Andriy Valentynov (pen name for Andriy Shmalko), Ukrainian historian, archaeologist and science fiction author; in Kharkiv, Ukrainian SSR, Soviet Union

== March 19, 1958 (Wednesday) ==
- The European Parliamentary Assembly, an advisory body for the Common Market, the European Coal and Steel Community, and Euratom, held its first meeting, opening in Luxembourg City. The delegates elected Robert Schuman, former Prime Minister and Foreign Minister of France, as the Assembly's president.
- Cuba became the second nation (after the U.S.) to inaugurate color television.
- In the U.S. state of New York, a fire at a garment factory killed 24 people. The blaze started on the third floor of the five-story building at 3:55 in the afternoon when a textile-drying oven at the Monarch Underwear Company exploded.
- South Pacific, the film adaptation of the 1949 Rodgers and Hammerstein stage musical, had its premiere with the debut showing at the Criterion Theatre in New York City. Originally almost three hours in length, it would be edited to two-and-a-half hours for its nationwide release and become the most popular film for the year 1958.
- Warner Bros. Records, the company which would later become Warner Records, was founded as a subsidiary of Warner Bros. Pictures.

== March 20, 1958 (Thursday) ==
- Elections were held for the 52-seat House of Commons of Northern Ireland within the United Kingdom. Prime Minister Basil Brooke's Ulster Unionist Party was unopposed in 25 districts and needed to win only two races to keep majority control. The UUP lost one seat but retained a majority with 37 seats; the other 15 seats were split among six parties.
- Born: Holly Hunter, American film actress and Academy Award winner for Best Actress; in Conyers, Georgia

== March 21, 1958 (Friday) ==
- The existence of a new strain of the bacterium staphylococcus aureus, which was resistant to penicillin and other known antibiotics, was announced by the U.S. Public Health Service. A new antibiotic, methicillin, would be discovered in 1960 as effective against the new strain, but would later be matched by another strain, Methicillin-resistant Staphylococcus aureus or MRSA.
- A fire in the Egyptian town of Damat Kutur killed at least 16 people and seriously injured another 11 after starting in a small hut with a straw roof and then being spread by pigeons who had been on the hut's roof. "Flying in agony," a United Press report noted, "the birds acted as flying torches, setting fire to the straw roofs of hundreds of other huts."
- Bulldozers and helicopters were able to end a 36-hour crisis at a small restaurant on the Pennsylvania Turnpike, where more than 800 travelers trapped by a blizzard were crowded in a restaurant that had a capacity for only 100. A traffic jam of over 1,000 cars, buses and trucks, caused by a 42-inch (1,100 mm) snowfall on Wednesday night, had stalled on a 14-mile (23 km) stretch of the highway and had made their way to the only shelter available, a Howard Johnson's restaurant.
- Born:
  - Raul Khajimba, President of Abkhazia 2014 to 2020 and former Prime Minister (2003 to 2004); in Tkvarcheli, Georgian SSR, Soviet Union
  - Sabrina Le Beauf, American TV actress; in New Orleans
  - Gary Oldman, English film actor; in London
- Died: Cyril M. Kornbluth, 34, American science fiction author, died of a heart attack while in the New York City subway.

== March 22, 1958 (Saturday) ==
- An attempt by the French National Assembly to make reforms, to replace the French Fourth Republic with a system with a stronger executive branch, failed by one vote to get the three-fifths majority required for immediate amending the national constitution. Needing 309 of the 514 votes in the Assembly, the measure had a 308 to 206 result, and would require submission to a referendum if approved by the Council of the Republic.

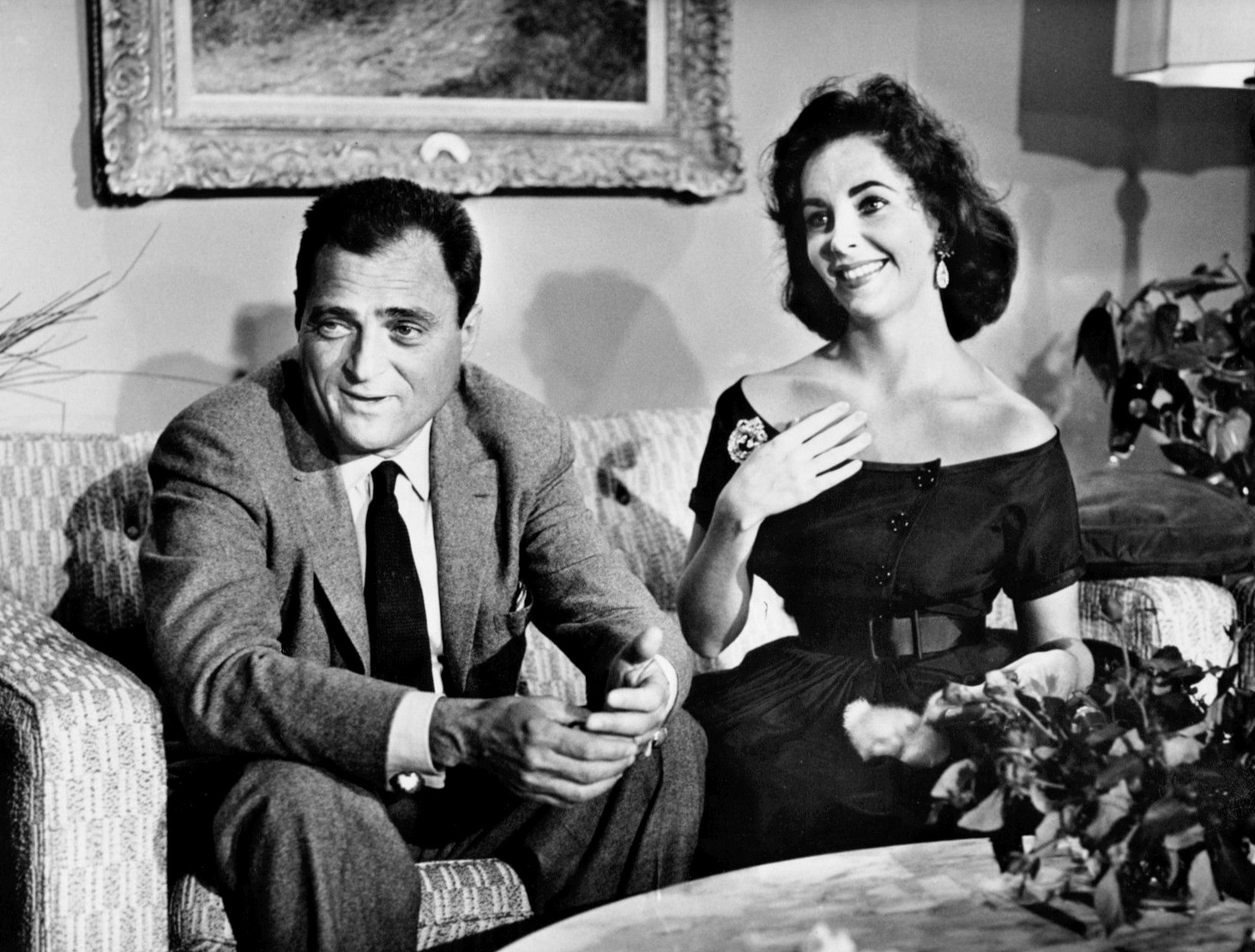
Todd & Taylor five months earlier

- Mike Todd, a successful film and theatrical producer, was killed in the crash of his Lockheed Model 18 Lodestar twin-engine airplane, along with his biographer and screenwriter Art Cohn, 48, pilot Bill Verner and co-pilot Tom Barclay. The overloaded plane was flying Todd back home to Hollywood after his promotional visit to Albuquerque, New Mexico when it suffered an engine failure in icing conditions and crashed in the Zuni Mountains near Grants, New Mexico. Todd had been since 1957 the third husband of actress Elizabeth Taylor (who was not aboard because she had stayed home with a bout of bronchitis) and was an ex-husband of Joan Blondell.
- Former U.S. President Harry S. Truman served briefly as conductor for the Kansas City Philharmonic orchestra as part of a benefit concert for the organization, guiding the musicians in their performance of John Philip Sousa's famous march, The Stars and Stripes Forever.
- Police in the French village of Mont-d'Origny arrested U.S. Army Private Wayne Powers, a 37-year-old native of Chillicothe, Missouri, who had deserted his unit in Verdun in November, 1944. For more than 13 years, Powers lived with Yvette Beleuse, and the two had five children. The police turned Powers over to U.S. military authorities at Verdun, where he was court-martialed and sentenced to ten years imprisonment. Tens of thousands of French citizens wrote to the U.S. Army and the U.S. Embassy in Paris and asked for clemency, and his sentence was later commuted to six months at hard labor. He would be released on October 9, 1958, after serving his sentence.

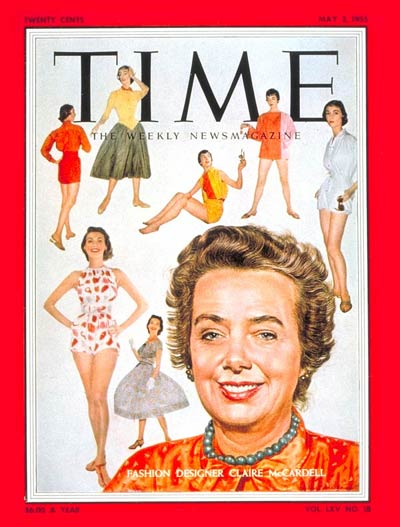
McCardell

- Died: Claire McCardell, 52, American fashion designer known for her practical, comfortable designs

== March 23, 1958 (Sunday) ==
- The University of Kentucky Wildcats won the NCAA basketball championship, defeating the Seattle University Chieftains, 84 to 72, at the finals at Freedom Hall in Louisville, Kentucky. Despite being on the losing team, Seattle's Elgin Baylor was voted the game's most valuable player.
- Voting was held in the European principality of Liechtenstein for its 15-seat legislature, the Landtag. The Progressive Citizens' Party (FBP), led by Prime Minister Alexander Frick, with an 8 to 7 majority over the Patriotic Union (VU), increased its strength to a 9 to 6 lead.
- Voting was held in Yugoslavia for the 301-member Federal Council, with 306 candidates allowed by the Eastern European nation's Communist Party, the Socialist Alliance. Voters in five of the electoral districts had a choice between two candidates.
- In the Central American nation of El Salvador, all 54 candidates of the military-backed Partido Revolucionario de Unificación Democrática (PRUD) ran unopposed in elections for the 54-seat Asamblea Legislativa.
- The Sangkum, a political party led by Prince Norodom Sihanouk in Cambodia, won all 61 seats in nationwide voting for the southeast Asian nation's parliament, the Rodthsaphea. All but 409 votes out of 1.6 million were for Sangkum candidates.
- Died:
  - Charlotte Walker, 81, American stage actress and Broadway star
  - Florian Znaniecki, 76, Polish sociologist and pioneer in empirical sociology

== March 24, 1958 (Monday) ==
- Saudi Arabia's King Saud, who had reigned over the Middle Eastern nation since 1953, transferred most of his absolute power to his younger brother, Crown Prince Faisal.
- In the U.S., nine of the 24 people on Braniff Airways Flight 971 were killed when it crashed shortly after taking off from Miami on a flight to Panama. The four-engine Douglas DC-7C propeller-driven airplane experienced an engine fire and returned to the Miami Airport for an emergency landing, but the burning wing ripped loose and the plane crashed into the Everglades and burned in a marsh more than 4 miles (6.4 km) from the runway. An investigation later blamed the crash on "The failure of the captain to maintain altitude during an emergency return to the airport due to his undue preoccupation with an engine fire following takeoff." The loss of the airplane's wing (which fell 50 yards (46 m) from the cabin) proved to be fortunate. Survivors told investigators that "all aboard might have been killed had not a flaming wing section ripped loose from the plane and had not Everglades marshes helped absorb the shock of impact."

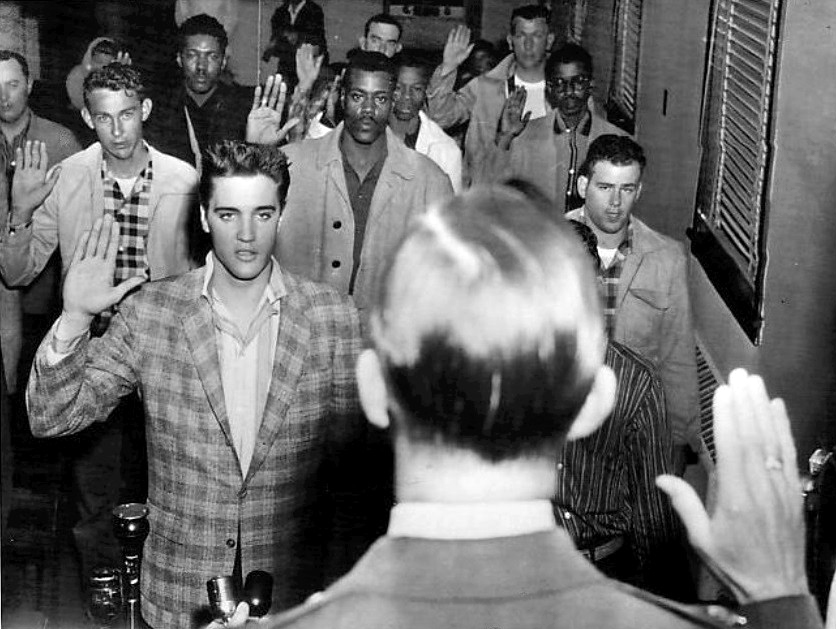
Presley and others being sworn in at Fort Chaffee

- After being drafted, popular American singer Elvis Presley was inducted into the U.S. Army as a private for a two-year tour of duty, with serial number #53310761. He began training at Fort Chaffee near the city of Fort Smith, Arkansas.
- Died:
  - Rear Admiral Alexandros Hatzikyriakos, 82, Greek naval officer and former Foreign Minister of Greece
  - Herbert Fields, 60, American composer and screenwriter

== March 25, 1958 (Tuesday) ==
- The largest non-nuclear explosion in the Soviet Union, an underground blast, was so powerful that U.S. Senate Disarmament Subcommittee Chairman Hubert H. Humphrey said later that it had been detected more than 5,000 miles (8,000 km) away and that "if caused by chemicals, would probably have required 100 freight carloads of explosives." Senator Humphrey would reveal the news shortly after Moscow Radio predicted on April 6 that the Soviet Union would use small atomic weapons to build immense tunnels "in the near future".
- The West Indies Federation, the 10-member union of islands in the Caribbean Sea, held its first and only parliamentary elections. Of the 45 seats of the Federation's House of Representatives, the West Indies Federal Labour Party, led by Grantley Adams of Barbados and Norman Manley of Jamaica, won a majority with 25 seats.
- Cuba's Congress voted to approve the declaration by President Batista of "a state of national emergency" and granted him full power to respond to the insurgency by 26th of July Movement leader Fidel Castro.
- Canada's supersonic Avro Arrow jet interceptor made its maiden flight. The aircraft was never put into production and the project would be cancelled 11 months later on February 20, 1959.
- In a split decision, Sugar Ray Robinson won the world middleweight boxing championship for the fifth time in his career, defeating title holder Carmen Basilio, who had beaten Robinson in September.
- Died: Tom Brown (trombonist), 69, American Dixieland bandleader and trombonist

== March 26, 1958 (Wednesday) ==
- John McEwen was selected as the new leader of the Australian Country Party (ACP), succeeding former Prime Minister Arthur Fadden. McEwen would briefly serve as Prime Minister after the disappearance of Harold Holt at the end of 1967.
- Taekkyeon, one of the Korean martial arts, was revived by its last surviving Master, Song Deok-gi, after having been banned during the Japanese occupation and almost extinguished during the Korean War. Song gave a public demonstration of the discipline at a celebration to honor the birthday of President Syngman Rhee.
- The Parliament of Iraq approved an amendment to the Iraqi constitution to grant certain women (specifically, those with a primary education) the right to vote, becoming the fifth Arab nation (after Egypt, Syria, Tunisia and Lebanon) since 1955 to allow women suffrage. Parliament also gave King Faisal II the authority to form a union with other Arab countries, clearing the way for Iraq to join the Arab Federation by uniting with Jordan.
- The United States Army launched Explorer 3, the third American orbital satellite and the fifth overall. The final stage of the Jupiter-C rocket misfired and the 31 pounds (14 kg) spacecraft did not reach the necessary angle for the planned orbit, going instead into an orbit whose perigee was only 125 miles (201 km).
- At the 30th Academy Awards ceremony, the motion picture The Bridge on the River Kwai won seven Oscars, including the Academy Award for Best Picture.
- Born: Alar Karis, President of Estonia since 2021; in Tartu
- Died: Phil Mead, 71, English first-class cricketer

== March 27, 1958 (Thursday) ==
- Nikolai Bulganin was removed from his position as Chairman of the Council of Ministers of the Soviet Union, without explanation, and replaced as the head of the Soviet government by the Soviet Communist Party's First Secretary (and de facto leader of the U.S.S.R.), Nikita Khrushchev. The first clue of Premier Bulganin's fall from grace came two days earlier, when he was not included in the group of Soviet officials who hosted United Nations Secretary-General Dag Hammarskjöld and not mentioned at all in a Radio Moscow report of six persons present at the Kremlin dinner. On June 19, 1957, the "Anti-Party Group" within the Communist Party Politburo had attempted to remove Khrushchev as the First Secretary and had secured a 7 to 4 vote in favor of placing Premier Bulganin in the position. Khrushchev had taken the matter to the full Central Committee, which reversed the Politburo decision, and the three members of the Anti-Party effort (Georgy Malenkov, Vyacheslav Molotov and Lazar Kaganovich) were quickly removed. "Since it would have been awkward to dismiss Khrushchev's own prime minister" in 1957, an author would later note, "Bulganin temporarily remained at his post as window dressing," until the next meeting of the Supreme Soviet could vote to accept Bulganin's resignation. Bulganin was given a position as chairman of Gosbank, the government's central bank.
- The government of France issued an order banning the controversial book La Question, a book by Henri Alleg that revealed torture techniques used by the French Army during the ongoing Algerian War. Released on February 18 by Éditions de Minuit, La Question had sold 60,000 copies before the government seized the remaining 7,000 and banned its sale on national security grounds. The basis for invoking the censorship law was "attempted demoralization of the Army with intent to harm the defense of the nation". Within two weeks, a publishing house in Switzerland, Éditions de la Cité, would print another run of copies.

== March 28, 1958 (Friday) ==
- Jeremiah Reeves, an African-American man who was sentenced to death after being convicted for a rape of a white woman, committed when he was 17 years old, was executed in the electric chair at Kilby Prison in Montgomery, Alabama, less than five hours after Alabama Governor Jim Folsom announced that a plea for clemency would not be granted. For more than five years, beginning after Reeves's arrest in 1952, the NAACP had hired attorneys to defend Reeves and had taken his case up to the U.S. Supreme Court. Although put on trial for one rape after his arrest on November 10, 1952, Reeves had been initially indicted for crimes against six women in Montgomery, one for robbery, three for assault with intent to rape and two for rape. On December 6, 1954, the U.S. Supreme Court set aside his conviction and remanded the matter for another trial. Reeves was convicted again on June 2, 1955 and sentenced to death a second time. On January 13, 1958, the U.S. Supreme Court voted, 8 to 1, to deny a second appeal. Dr. Martin Luther King would write later in his memoir that the Reeves case illustrated the unequal treatment of black and white men in the meting out of sentences: "It was the severity of Jeremiah Reeves's penalty that aroused the Negro community, not the question of his guilt or innocence. But not only are we here to repent for the sin committed against Jeremiah Reeves, but we are also here to repent for the constant miscarriage of justice that we confront every day in our courts. The death of Jeremiah Reeves is only the precipitating factor for our protest, not the causal factor. The causal factor lies deep down in the dark and dreary past of our oppression. The death of Jeremiah Reeves is but one incident, yes a tragic incident, in the long and desolate night of our court injustice."
- Born:
  - Bart Conner, American gymnast and Olympic gold medalist; in Morton Grove, Illinois
  - Curt Hennig, American professional wrestler and WWE celebrity; in Robbinsdale, Minnesota (d. 2003 from a cocaine overdose)
- Died:
  - W. C. Handy, 84, American blues music composer and musician known as "the Father of the Blues" for making the genre popular.
  - Chuck Klein, 53, American baseball outfielder, 1932 National League MVP and batting champion and Baseball Hall of Fame enshrinee, died of a cerebral hemorrhage.
  - Charles H. Strub, 73, American dentist, entrepreneur and sportsman who successfully lobbied California to bring horse racing and parimutuel betting to California and opened the Santa Anita Park.

== March 29, 1958 (Saturday) ==
- Representatives of Brazil and Bolivia signed the Roboré Agreement in an attempt to resolve their boundary dispute over islands in the Amazon River between the two, including the Isla Suárez, an island claimed by both sides and located in a tributary of the Amazon, the Mamoré River.
- The Soviet Union's Ministry of Education created a university in Khabarovsk in the Russian SFSR, initially called the Khabarovsk Automobile Highway Institute for engineering. The institution would become the Khabarovsk Polytechnical Institute in 1962 and, after the breakup of the Soviet Union, the Khabarovsk State University of Technology (in 1992) and, as of 2005, the Pacific National University with 21,000 students.
- England's Grand National steeplechase race was held at Aintree Racecourse in Liverpool and won by Irish thoroughbred Mr. What, ridden by Arthur Freeman.

== March 30, 1958 (Sunday) ==
- Ukrainian-born French ballet master Serge Lifar fought a duel with swords against Chilean-born French ballet producer George de Cuevas over changes made by Cuevas to Lifar's ballet, Suite en blanc. Only 50 members of the press were told of the time and place for the duel, which ended with Lifar receiving a cut to his forearm in what W. Granger Blair of The New York Times described as "what may well have been the most delicate encounter in the history of French dueling."
- The pilot of National Airlines Flight 508 narrowly averted a head-on collision with a two-engine plane at 8,000 feet (2,400 m) during his approach to New York at the end of a flight from Palm Beach, Florida. With 58 people on board, the pilot of the Douglas DC-6, Jack A. Guthrie, was over New Jersey and still 70 miles (110 km) from New York when he saw the smaller plane flying directly toward him. Guthrie made a steep dive, causing 11 persons to require medical treatment, but was able to land safely at New York International Airport at "Idlewild", later renamed for the late President John F. Kennedy and referred to now as "JFK Airport".
- Born:
  - Maurice LaMarche, Canadian-born American voice actor; in Toronto
  - Lucy Turnbull, Australian businesswoman and politician, Lord Mayor of Sydney 2003-2004 and wife of Australian Prime Minister Malcolm Turnbull while he held office 2015-2018; in Mittagong, New South Wales
- Died: Javier Pereira, Colombian citizen who claimed that he was 168 years old

== March 31, 1958 (Monday) ==
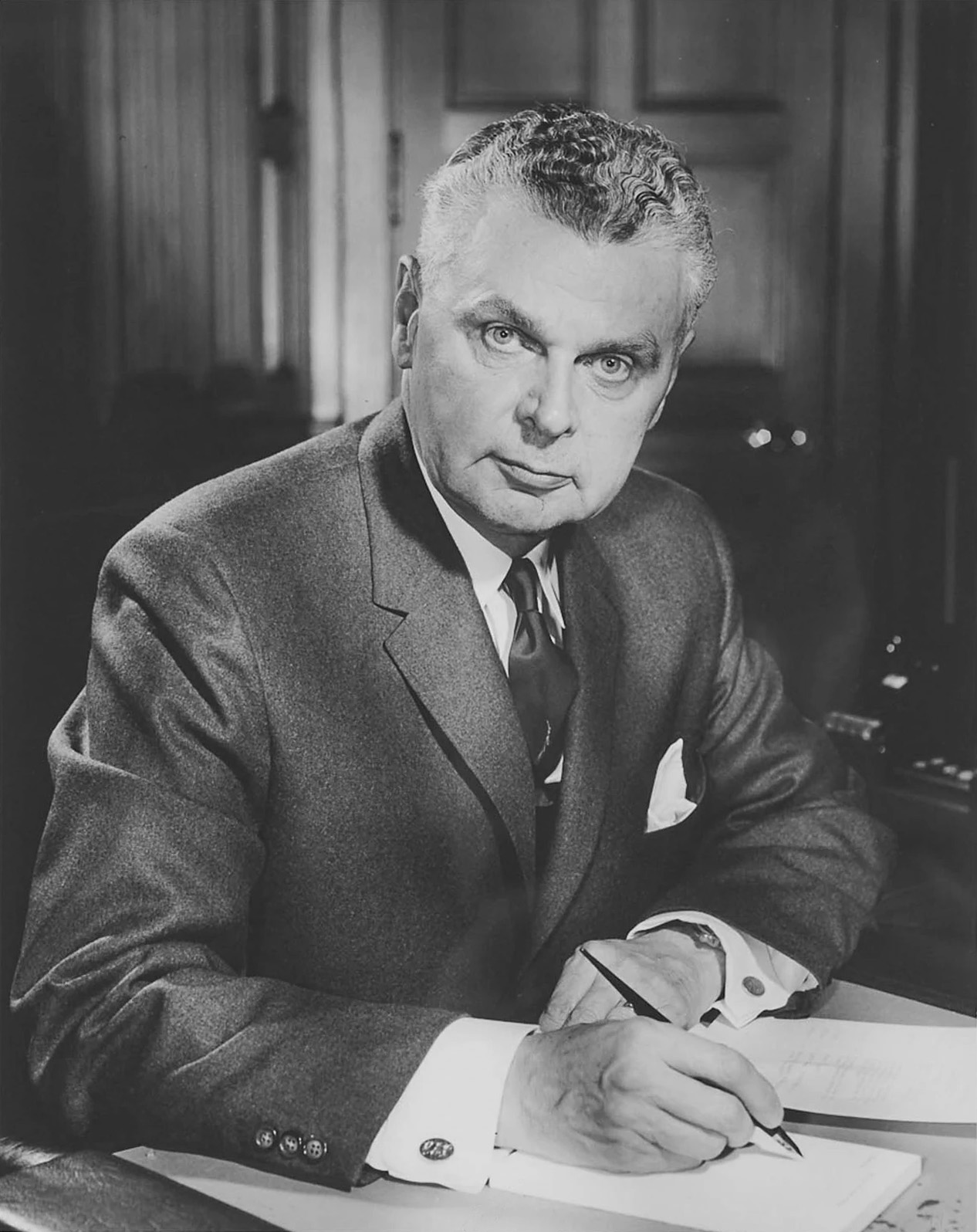
Canada's Prime Minister Diefenbaker

- Nationwide voting for the House of Commons of Canada took place less than eight months after the previous vote that had given the Progressive Conservative Party (PC) a plurality in the 265-member body. The PC, led by Prime Minister John Diefenbaker went from a 112 to 105 lead over Lester B. Pearson's Liberal Party to a 208 to 48 lead, an increase of more than 85%.
- The Supreme Soviet, legislature of the Soviet Union, approved a decision to halt nuclear testing, conditional on other nuclear powers doing the same. A worldwide moratorium by the three nuclear powers (the U.S., the USSR and the UK) would begin in November and last for three years.
- The ocean liner MS Skaubryn caught fire and sank in the Indian Ocean while 300 miles (480 km) off of the cost of Africa. All but one of the more than 1,300 passengers and crew on the I. M. Skaugen Line ship were rescued after evacuating to lifeboats. They were reached first by a Polish Ocean Lines cargo ship, MS Małgorzata Fornalska which then was able to transfer the persons on board to SS City of Sydney, a larger freighter of the British Ellerman Line. MS Skaubryn was less than halfway through its West Germany to Australia voyage from Bremerhaven to Sydney.
- Austrian Airlines, a subsidiary of Lufthansa and the national airline of Austria, began operations with a flight from Vienna to the Swiss city of Zürich, in a leased Vickers Viscount airplane.
- Ian Fleming's Dr. No, the sixth in his James Bond series, was first published. On October 5, 1962, the book would be the first Bond novel to be adapted to film, starring Sean Connery as Bond.
