= Fat cat =

Slang for a wealthy and powerful person

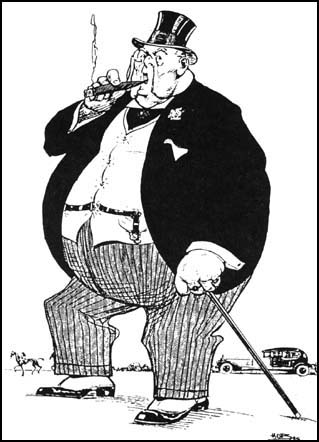
Caricature of a fat cat

Fat cat is a political term originally describing a rich political donor, also called an angel or big-money man.

The New York Times has described fat cats as symbols of "a deeply corrupt campaign finance system riddled with loopholes", with Americans seeing them as recipients of the "perks of power", but able to "buy access, influence policy and even veto appointments".

It is also commonly used to describe a rich, powerful and greedy person who, due to ownership of large amounts of capital, is able to "live easy" off the work of others. In the United Kingdom, it is also used to refer to executives whose pay is deemed by others to be excessive.

== History ==
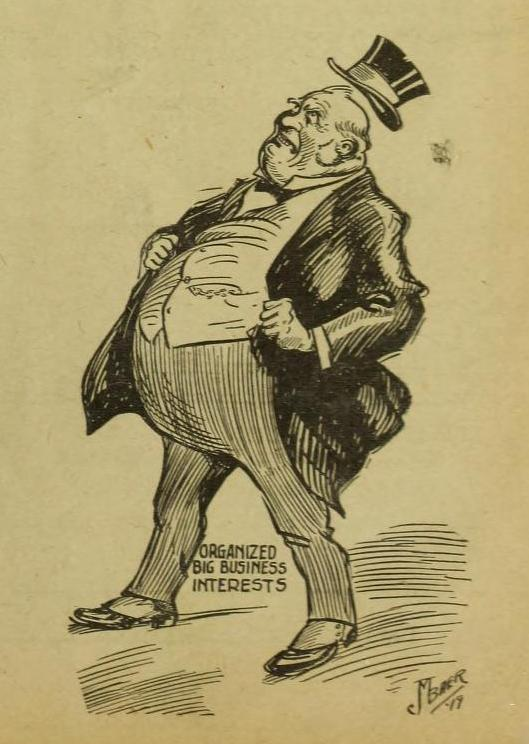
1917 caricature of "Organized Big Business Interests"

The word was first used in the 1920s in the United States to describe rich political donors.

The term's coinage for political purposes has been attributed to Frank Kent, a writer for The Baltimore Sun whose essay "Fat Cats and Free Rides" appeared in the American Mercury, a magazine of commentary run by H. L. Mencken. Kent wrote:

A Fat Cat is a man of large means and slight political experience who, having reached middle age, and success in business, and finding no further thrill, sense or satisfaction in the mere piling up of more millions, develops a yearning for some sort of public honor, and is willing to pay for it. There are such men in all the States, and they are as welcome to the organization [i.e., the party] as the flowers in May. They relieve the pressure all along the line, lighten the load, make life brighter and better for the busy machine workers. The [political] machine has what the Fat Cat wants [i.e., public honor], and the Fat Cat has what the machine must have, to wit, money

The 1960 campaign for the Democratic nomination to the presidency was marked by competition between fellow Senators Hubert Humphrey and John F. Kennedy. Their first meeting was in the Wisconsin primary, where Kennedy's well-organized and well-funded campaign defeated Humphrey's energetic but poorly funded effort. Humphrey objected to the media, "The Kennedy forces are waging a psychological blitz that I cannot match. I'm not the candidate of the fat cats."

A 1972 book by sociologist G. William Domhoff, titled Fat Cats and Democrats, contrasted the Democratic Party's perceived populism with its funding structure. In Domhoff's view, "Short of a nationwide system of public financing for candidates ... it seems likely that wealthy fat cats will find one way or another to finance the candidates of their choice."

The campaign finance reforms following the Watergate scandal greatly reduced the amount of money that individuals could contribute to a political campaign. In the words of Ben J. Wattenberg, "The fat cats were driven from the temple".

During a 1997 $1,000-per-plate dinner at the Hilton Washington for the Republican Party, which The New York Times dubbed "a lucrative display of the resilience of big-money campaign fund-raising", street protesters calling for further reform dressed in "fat cat" costumes and chanted "Hey, hey, ho, ho! Corporate fat cats have to go!" In the 2008 Democratic race, a group of wealthy backers of Sen. Hillary Clinton wrote to Speaker of the House Nancy Pelosi, warning her they might withdraw financial support for the Democratic Congressional Campaign Committee if Pelosi did not change her position on whether the party's superdelegates "should support the party's pledged delegate leader". According to OpenSecrets, the signers included donors such as Haim Saban and Robert L. Johnson, and had given the party nearly $24 million since 2000. In response, the grassroots liberal political action committee MoveOn called the move "the worst kind of insider politics -- billionaires bullying our elected leaders into ignoring the will of the voters", but reassured members that "when we all pool our resources, together we're stronger than the fat cats."

== Use in culture and imagery ==
The word has since acquired a meaning of a rich, powerful person of possibly "undeserved" wealth. It is now commonly used in editorial cartoons. In the British printed media, a fat cat is often depicted as a cat-faced, corpulent, middle-aged man clad in a pin striped suit and holding or smoking a thick cigar, representing a venal banker or a high earner executive or "captain of industry".

It is also a term familiar with musicians. James Brown's 1973 song "Down and Out in New York City" includes the lyrics "All the fat cats, in the bad hats". Muse's 2009 song "Uprising" also references the term in its lyrics: "Rise up and take the power back; it's time the fat cats have a heart attack". The punk band NOFX repeatedly uses the term in their song "Perfect Government" on their album Punk in Drublic ("How did the cat get so fat?").

== See also ==
- Oligarchy
- Plutocracy
