= Symphony No. 2 (Kilar) =

Symphony by Wojciech Kilar

- Sinfonia concertante
- by Wojciech Kilar
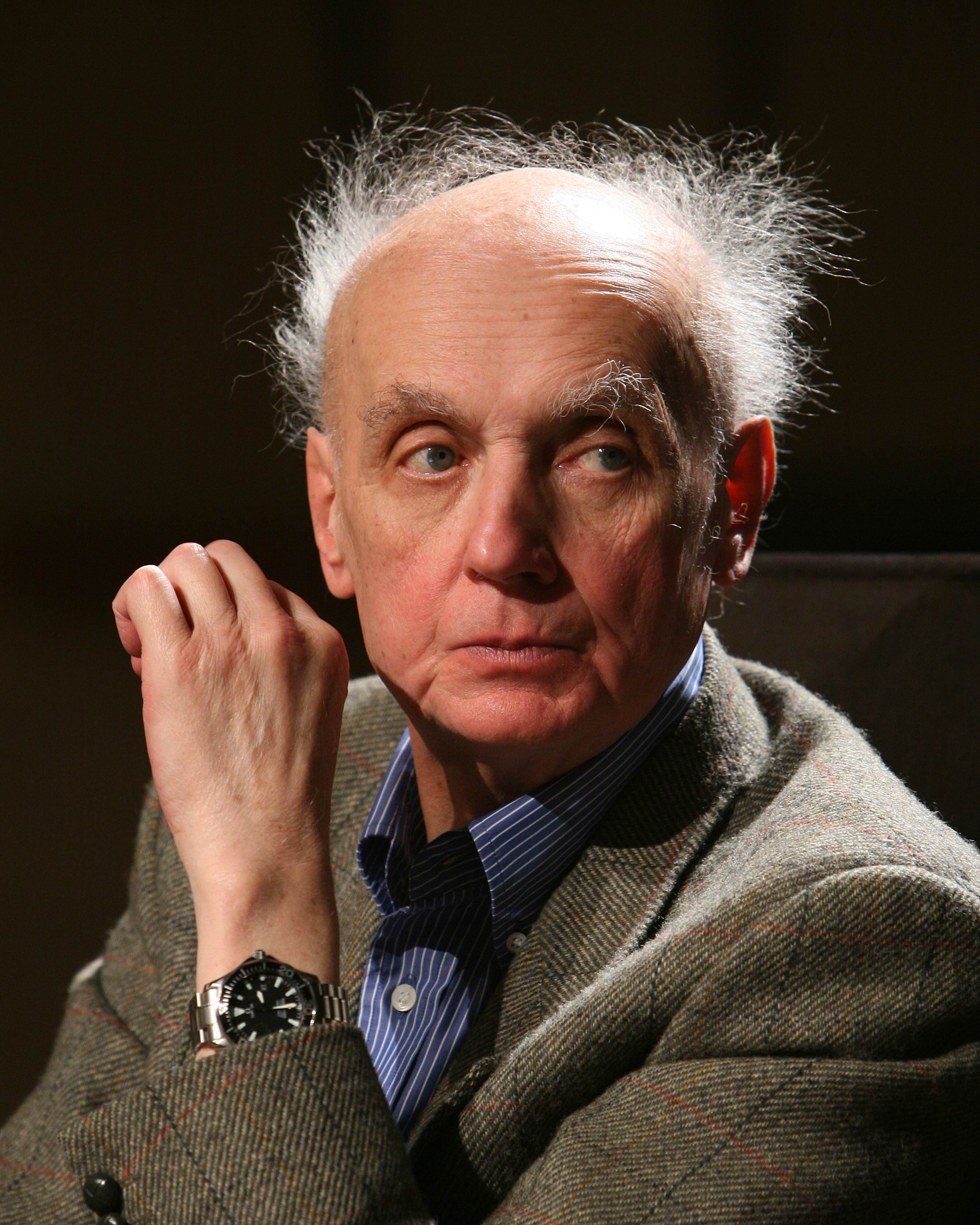
- The composer in 2006
- Composed: 1956
- Dedication: Jan Franciszek Kilar
- Performed: 23 April 1958: Katowice
- Duration: 33:53
- Movements: Three

Premiere
- Conductor: Jan Krenz

The Symphony No. 2 ,Sinfonia concertante” (Polish: II Symfonia „Sinfonia concertante”) is a symphony in three movements by Wojciech Kilar.

A year after completing his studies in composition and writing his diploma thesis Symphony No. 1, Wojciech Kilar wrote his second piece in this genre. It is dominated by the influences of Béla Bartók, Maurice Ravel and Sergei Prokofiev. Researchers also see a reference to the work of Karol Szymanowski in the Kilar's Symphony No. 2. Due to its monumental nature, Symphony No. 2 can be considered a summary of the composer's work and research during this period of his life. Kilar dedicated the work to his father Jan Franciszek Kilar. The piece intended for piano and great symphony orchestra. The composition consists of three parts. The world premiere took place in Katowice on April 23, 1958. The Polish National Radio Symphony Orchestra was conducted by Jan Krenz, and the author on the piano.

Titles of parts of a work:

1. Andante. Allegro
2. Adagio
3. Allegro vivace
