= María Luisa Sepúlveda =

Chilean composer and music educator

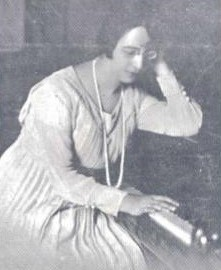
Maria Luisa Sepúlveda

Maira María Luisa Sepúlveda (14 August 1898 – 4 April 1958) was a Chilean composer and music educator.

== Biography ==
María Luisa Sepúlveda was born in Chillán, the daughter of Bernardo Sepúlveda, professor of philosophy and languages at the Lyceum, and poet Maira Mercedes. She graduated from secondary studies at the Lyceum for Girls. She went on to study at the National Conservatory of Music with Bindo Paoli for piano, José Varalla for violin and Luis Esteban Giarda and Domingo Brescia for harmony, counterpoint and composition.

She graduated with a piano degree in 1905, and in composition in 1918, then took a position as professor of piano at the National Conservatory where she worked until 1931. After leaving the Conservatory, she taught harmony and folklore at the Vocational School for Arts Education in Santiago. She died in Santiago.

== Works ==
Sepúlveda composed many works based on Chilean folk music, and also texts for use in music education including "Método de Guitarra" and "El amigo del niño" for beginning piano students. Selected works include:

- La Voz del Pasado
- Cancionero Chileno
- Estudio Sinfónico y Greca for orchestra (1932)
- Canción de las Corhuillas y Trutruka for orchestra (1940)
- Suite for chamber orchestra and piano (1940)
- Seis Canciones Escolares for voice and piano
- Ronda Primaveral for voice and piano
- Ronda de Paz for voice and piano
- Dos Rondas, sobre poesías de Gabriela Mistral for voice and piano
- El Imposible y Tres Tonadas from folklore melodies
