= Diop Kamau =

American civil rights activist (born 1957/1958)

Diop Kamau (born Don Jackson, 1957/1958) is an American civil rights activist and former law enforcement officer. Kamau transitioned from law enforcement to activism after his father was beaten by police officers and he himself experienced racial harassment on the job. Kamau runs the Police Complaint Center to collect and investigate allegations of police abuse.

== Early life and education ==
Kamau was born in south Los Angeles County. His father, Woodrow Jackson, was one of the first Black men hired by the Los Angeles County Sheriff's Office. Kamau graduated from California Lutheran College. In 1996, Kamau attended Florida State University in Tallahassee as a graduate student.

Kamau earned his master's degree at Penn State University. He pursued a PhD in criminology at Florida State University. Kamau was an adjunct professor at Penn State, Florida A&M University, and Florida State University.

== Career ==
After graduating from California Lutheran College, Kamau joined the Ventura County Sheriff's Department as a deputy. In 1982, he joined the Hawthorne Police Department in 1982 and was promoted to sergeant in 1986. In Hawthorne, Kamau was offended by racist slurs by his co-workers. Kamau went on disability leave from the Hawthorne Police Department in 1987. Kamau filed a lawsuit against the Hawthorne Police Department for racial discrimination and harassment. Kamau's father, now retired from the Los Angeles County Sheriff's Office, was pulled over by Pomona police and beaten; Woodrow filed a lawsuit against the city and the Pomona Police Department. Kamau was motivated by this incident to document police officers abusing people.

In 1989, Kamau and another Black man who also worked in law enforcement were accompanied by NBC photographers as they drove through Long Beach. Their vehicle was pulled over and Kamau was beaten and arrested. The local NBC station aired their footage of the arrest, contradicting the officers' report and bringing scrutiny on the Long Beach Police Department. One of the arresting officers was charged with excessive force and both officers were charged with falsifying a police report, however the jury at their trial were unable to reach a verdict and a mistrial was declared. The video of Kamau's arrest received national media attention.

After the incident, Kamau spoke out against police abuse at local community rallies and city council meetings. The department placed him on disability leave. Kamau says the police psychiatrist reported that he was "hypersensitive to racism". Some police officers criticized Kamau's tactics, with one saying that "it creates a safety issue for officers and individuals". The president of the Long Beach Officers Association said, "Mr. Jackson's motives are apparent to any human being. If you go looking for trouble, you find it." Media attention on the case accused the local station of exceeding "objective journalism" and questioned Kamau's motives, implying that his tactics were a ploy for fame and financial benefit. Kamau also filed a civil suit after the incident, which was settled out-of-court for more than $100,000. After the incident, Kamau's editorial on police racism was published in The New York Times.

Kamau set up the Police Complaint Center in Florida in 1994 to investigate allegations of misconduct and abuse by law enforcement officers across the United States, which he blames on the culture of secrecy in police departments. Kamau provides training on problems such as racial profiling to law enforcement agencies across the country. Over six months, the Police Complaint Center investigated 170 complaints from across the country. Kamau partnered with the NAACP and Florida State University in 2000 to set up a complaint process for people to report abusive police behavior.

In 1998, Kamau contributed to a Dateline NBC investigation on police misconduct. Some agencies have accused Kamau of entrapment. The police chief of Florida State University said, "I don't agree with his methodology, but I can't argue with his results."

== Personal life ==
Kamau married Tyra Ferrell in 1992. After their marriage, he changed his name from Don Jackson to Diop Kamau, which he says is from West Africa and means "proud quiet warrior". Kamau and Tyra have a daughter. They moved to Tallahassee around 1995.
