= Rostov TV tower =

- Ростовская телебашня (Russian)
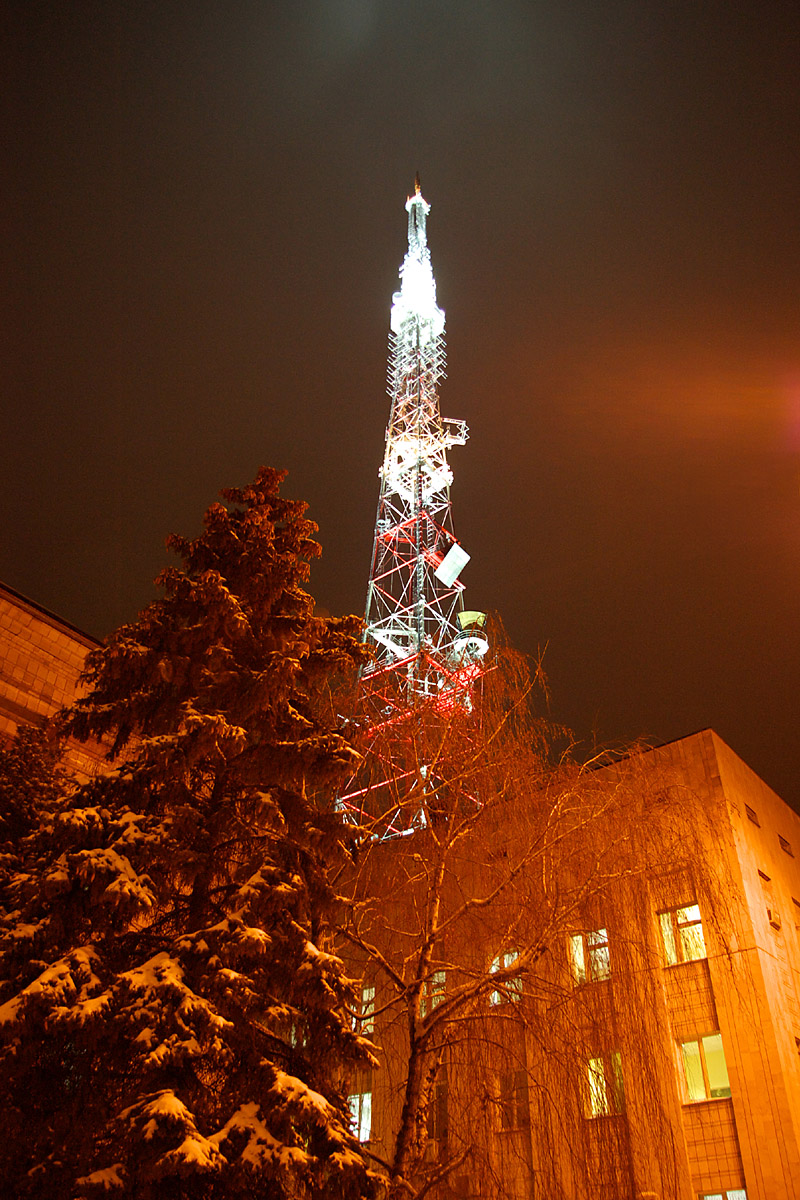

- Location within Russia
- Location: Barrikadnaya Street Rostov-on-Don, Russia

History
- Built: 1958

Site notes
- Architect: Moscow institute of steel structures
- Owner: ГТРК «Дон-ТР»

Rostov TV tower (Russian: Ростовская телебашня) is the standard television and broadcasting tower of the project 3803 KM located in Zheleznodorozhny district of Rostov-on-Don on Barrikadnaya Street. The TV tower is the highest construction in Rostov-on-Don. Its height is 195 meters. In an area of coverage of her transmitters there is a considerable part of the Rostov agglomeration by the population of 2,2 million people. It includes such large cities as Bataysk, Azov, Aksay.

== History ==
Telecasting era in the territory of the Rostov region began with construction of the Rostov TV tower of 195 meters high. The tower was designed by the Moscow institute of steel structures. Her construction was carried out for two years and was completed on 29 April 1958. Trial telecasts started the next day on 30 April 1958. Transfer of colour telecasting appeared since 1969. In 1992 there was a fire on a tower as a result of which burned out several cables and transformers. Accident has caused the termination of telecasting for 12 hours. The burned-out part of system of the transformer became the reason of it.

== Current state ==
The trellised open-work metal design leans on four concrete support. Sections of a tower are alternately painted in red and white colors. TV tower illumination in night-time is carried out by means of the laser light-emitting diodes. The bright luminescence of a tower is reached by use of fluorescent paint for painting of external elements.

The term of operation of the antenna of the Rostov tower was 14 years from the moment of installation. It functions still and wasn't replaced. Metal designs need painting.

== Alternatives. Pentashpil. ==
In 1998 Town-planning council of Rostov-on-Don approved the idea of Rostov citizen Sergey Kivenko who has developed the project of a new city television tower called by Pentashpil. Pentashpil is a 315-meter open-work tower representing five ascending support. But Kivenko's project was closed by city engineering council in March 1999.

In 2002 Sergey Kivenko's project "Pentashpil complex" was resumed.
