= Aurora Jiménez de Palacios =

Mexican politician (1922–1958)

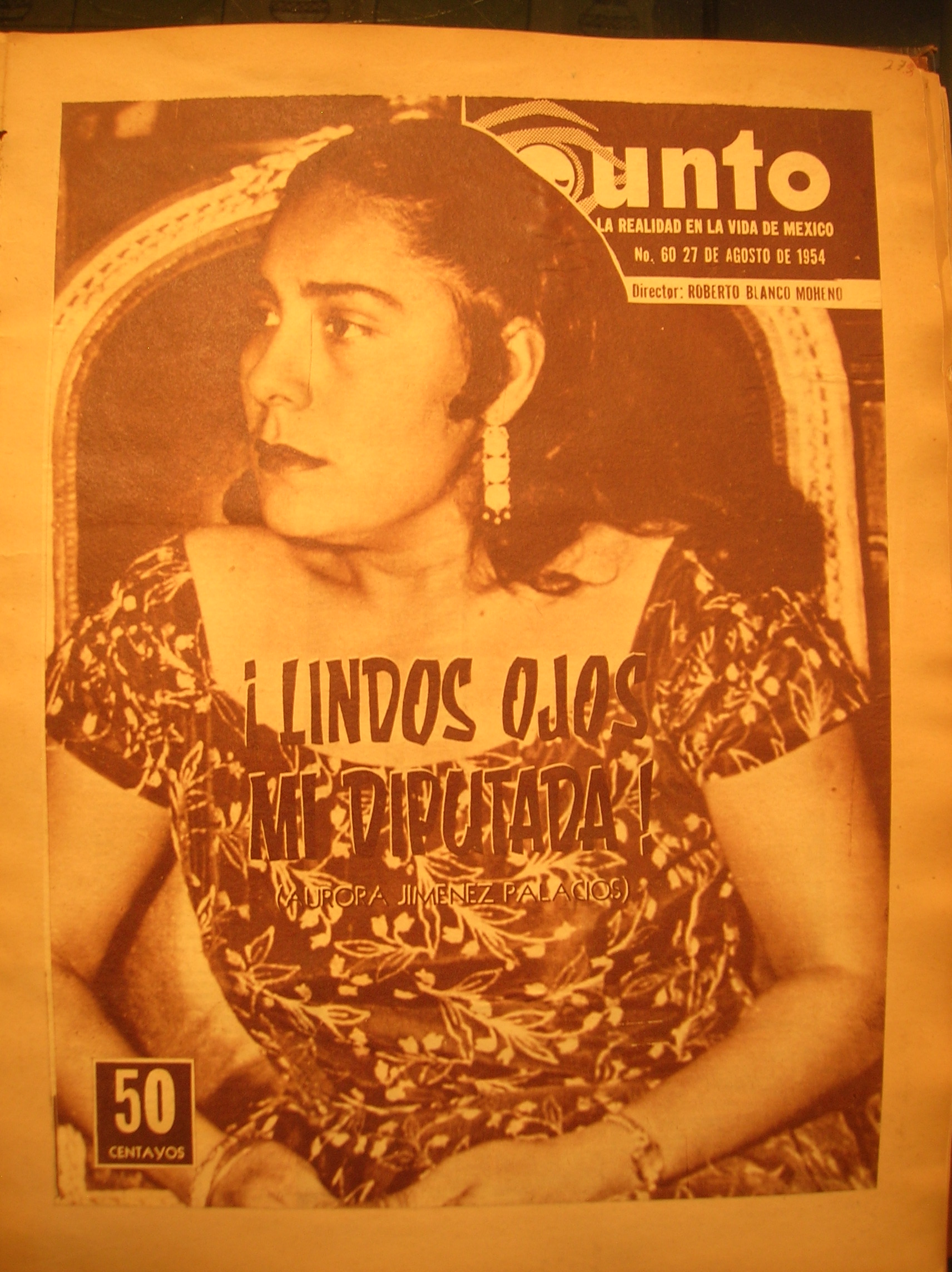

Member of the Chamber of Deputies for Baja California′s at-large district
- In office September 7, 1954 – August 31, 1955
- Preceded by: District created
- Succeeded by: District abolished

Personal details
- Born: December 9, 1922 Tecuala, Nayarit, Mexico
- Died: April 15, 1958 (aged 32)
- Cause of death: Plane crash
- Party: Institutional Revolutionary Party

Aurora Jiménez de Palacios (December 9, 1922 – April 15, 1958) was a Mexican lawyer and politician who became the first female federal deputy in Mexico.

In 1937 she participated in the formation of the Confederation of Mexican Workers, in Culiacán, Sinaloa.

She was a graduate of the University of Guadalajara in 1947. Also in 1947, Martha Aurora married José Cruz Palacios Sánchez and changed her residence to the city of Mexicali, where her husband was originally from.

Later she represented Baja California as a federal deputy in the 42nd Legislature. She was the first female federal deputy in Mexico.

She was killed in a plane crash on April 15, 1958.
