= Diane Elam =

American feminist writer (born 1958)

- Born: April 17, 1958 (age 68); Riverside, California, U.S.
- Education: Kenyon College; Brown University
- Occupation: Writer
- Writing career
- Notable works: Feminism and Deconstruction: Ms. en Abyme (1994)
- Literary movement: Feminism

Diane Michelle Elam (born April 17, 1958) is an American feminist writer, the author of Feminism and Deconstruction: Ms. en Abyme (1994), Romancing the Postmodern (1992), and co-editor (with Robyn Wiegman) of Feminism Beside Itself (1995).

A recurrent theme in her work is an argument against the possibility of a complete and definitive representation of women.

== Life ==
Elam was born on April 17, 1958, in Riverside, California. She is the daughter of father, Douglas Bradley, and mother, Leslie J. (Parman) Elam.

Elam attended to Kenyon College in 1980, graduated from Brown University with a Master of Arts in 1984, and received her Doctor of Philosophy from Brown as well in 1988. Elam was also professor of English literature and critical and cultural theory at Cardiff University in Wales, at Indiana University in Bloomington in the 1990s, and at Bryn Mawr College in Pennsylvania. Before his death in an airplane crash in 1994, she was married to fellow academic Bill Readings, a professor of Comparative Literature at the Université de Montréal.

== Works ==
- Diane Elam; Robyn Wiegman, Feminism beside itself New York; London : Routledge, 1995. ISBN 9780415910415
- Romancing the postmodern, London; New York : Routledge, 1992. ISBN 9780415079877
- Feminism and deconstruction : Ms. en abyme, London; New York : Routledge, 1994. ISBN 9780415091664
