= Frank Kent =

American journalist and political theorist

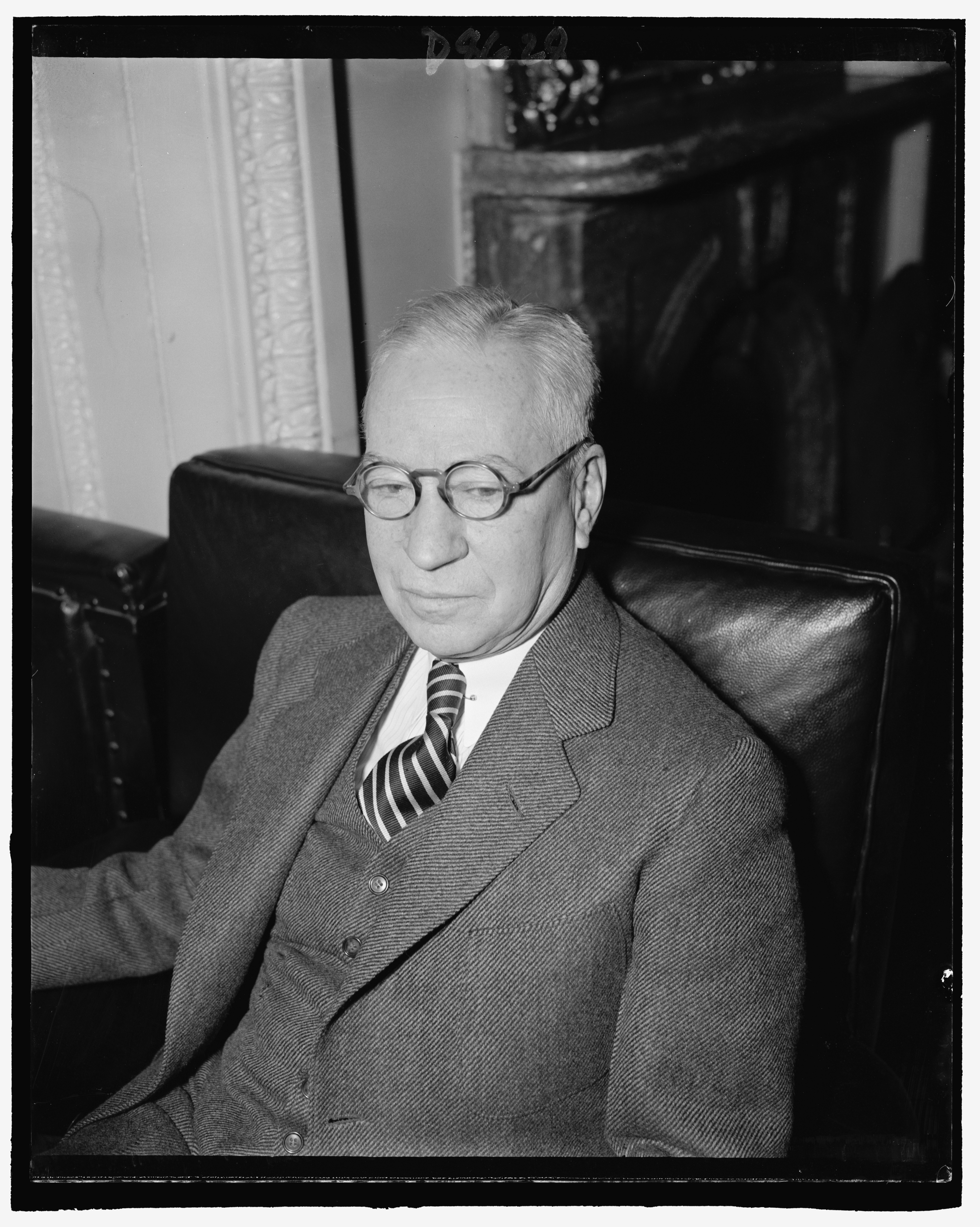
- Frank R. Kent (May 15, 1940)
- Born: Frank Richardson Kent; May 1, 1877; Baltimore
- Died: April 14, 1958 (aged 80)
- Citizenship: American
- Occupation: Journalist
- Years active: 1898–1958
- Employer: Baltimore Sun
- Known for: "Great Game of Politics" nationally syndicated column

Frank Richardson Kent (1877–1958) was an American journalist and political theorist of the 1920s and 1930s whose Baltimore Sun column "The Great Game of Politics" was syndicated nationally.

== Background ==
Frank Richardson Kent was born in 1877 in Baltimore, Maryland. His uncle was Frank Richardson, also a prominent journalist.

== Career ==
=== 1900s–1910s ===
Kent was based in Baltimore, where he started as a cub reporter for the Baltimore Sun in 1898 or 1900. His colleague was H.L. Mencken. In 1902, he wrote state and local politics. In 1910, he spent a year as Washington correspondent. In 1911, he became managing editor of both the Baltimore Sun and the Baltimore Evening Sun at the behest of the newspaper's new owner, Charles H. Grasty.

=== 1920s ===
In 1922, he became London correspondent. In 1923, Kent began a daily column on the front page of the Baltimore Sun called "The Great Game of Politics", syndicated to 140 papers nationwide (thanks in part to support from Franklin D. Roosevelt). He was one of the big-name journalists who covered the Scopes "Monkey Trial" in 1925. Kent championed President Herbert Hoover.

The Maryland Democratic Party approached Kent to run for office, but he declined in part because he despised methods of campaign financing and cherished his independence.

Kent wrote a column on Washington for The New Republic magazine during the administrations of Presidents Calvin Coolidge and Herbert Hoover.

=== 1930s ===
Although a nominal member of the Democratic Party, by the 1930s he was one of the leading conservative critics of the New Deal programs of the incoming administration of 32nd President Franklin D. Roosevelt (1882–1945, served 1933–1945), which attempted to fight and counteract the deepening Great Depression since the Wall Street Crash of 1929, at the beginning of the previous Republican Party administration of 31st President Herbert Hoover. Writing from the Washington Bureau of The Sun of Baltimore, Kent espoused his viewpoints with a daily column that beside informing just Baltimoreans and Marylanders but that reached millions of readers in syndicated additional newspapers across the country. Media historians group him with commentators/columnists David Lawrence, Walter Lippmann, Mark Sullivan, and Arthur Krock as influential political commentators in the 1930s.

But by 1934 Kent, a lifelong Democrat, turned against the New Deal. He criticized FDR and liberals who tried to disrupt his cherished Jeffersonian principles - the balanced budget, limited spending by the federal government, and a limited government. As his criticism became more severe, he charged that the Democrats no longer stood for states' rights. Kent pronounced the New Deal's AAA farm program a failure and was astonished that the Roosevelt administration did not propose to abandon it, but intended, instead, "to proceed from one experiment that has failed to a more drastic experiment along the same line" in the direction of greater control over agricultural production. As for the centerpiece of New Deal efforts to promote economic recovery, NRA, Kent found no enthusiasm for it any longer. People no longer looked to see if there was an NRA Blue Eagle in the windows of the stores where they shopped. But the principal objection to the NRA was the growing conviction that the Roosevelt administration had ceased to consider the NRA and AAA as "merely temporary devices for the duration of the emergency". Kent rejoiced when the Supreme Court invalidated the National Recovery Act. Desiring Roosevelt's defeat in the 1936 election, Kent was crushed by the election results.

In 1938, Kent quoted FDR aide Harry Hopkins saying, "We are going to spend, spend, spend, tax, tax, tax, elect, elect and elect", leading to the phrase he coined, "tax-and-spend Democrat".

=== 1940s ===
In 1947, Kent retired as journalist.

On February 27, 1949, Kent wrote on "Labor Bill Facts" for his "Great Game of Politics" column. Kent stated that the "multitudinous arguments and allegations" for and against repeal of the 1947 Taft-Hartley Act were too detailed for the "average citizen to grasp". However, Kent had four major points that any reader could understand. First, he explained, "the real force behind the drive to repeal are the CIO bosses and their publicity agencies", although supported by the AFL, UMW, and Railroad Brotherhood. Second, the CIO's "anti-Taft-Harley propaganda" vastly outweighed the act's supporters in terms of "violence, volume and in cost ... Literally, millions of dollars have been spent", more by the CIO than any other group. Third, labor unions care only for themselves, not the general public, while President Truman last year "used not only the arguments of Mr. Lee Pressman assailing the Taft-Hartley bill but much of his actual language. Fourth, the Truman administration owes labor so much for his 1948 election that he will sacrifice all others for them.

Over the years, Kent's column went from daily to twice-weekly to thrice-weekly and finally to Sunday weekly.

=== 1950s ===
In the 1950s, Kent championed President Dwight D. Eisenhower and Vice President Richard M. Nixon.

On January 5, 1958, Kent published the last installment of his column. At the time of his death three months later, he was vice president of A.S. Abell Company, publisher of the Baltimore Sun.

== Personal life and death ==
Kent married Minnie Whitman, who died in 1910; they had one child, Frank R. Kent Jr. In 1916, he married Elizabeth Thomas.

Kent started as a Wilsonian liberal but came out against FDR and his New Deal.

Alice Roosevelt Longworth, daughter of President Theodore Roosevelt and widow of Speaker of the House Nicholas Longworth, was one of Kent's chief sources of both gossip and inside information in Washington. She and Kent held regular social sessions in Washington. Rumor had it that they were lovers.

Kent served on the board of trustees for Science Service, now known and Society for Science & the Public, from 1923-1927.

Kent died age 80 on April 14, 1958, at the Johns Hopkins Hospital in Baltimore, Maryland.

At his death, obituaries were read into the Congressional Record from the Baltimore News-Post, Baltimore Evening Sun, Washington Evening Star, Washington Post, Roanoke Times, Pittsburgh Press, and Charleston News & Courier.

== Legacy ==
=== "The Great Game of Politics" ===
The start of Kent's daily column "The Great Game of Politics" was of such note that weekly news magazine Time covered it with its own article.

=== Memorial lecture ===
The Johns Hopkins University sponsors a Frank R. Kent Memorial Lecture in Journalism. Speakers have included: Russell Baker, Walter Cronkite, Sam Donaldson, David Halberstam, Ted Koppel, Jane Bryant Quinn, James Reston, and Marvin Kalb.

=== Recognition ===
In 1923, Time magazine wrote, "Frank R. Kent, of the Baltimore Sun, has a habit of writing articles for his paper that would be produced in toto in Time would space and the copyright law permit."

After becoming chief of the Washington bureau of the New York Times in 1931, Arthur Krock said that Kent, Richard V. Oulahan (Krock's predecessor at the Times) and J. C. O'Laughlin of the Chicago Tribune were the best and most influential members of the Washington press corps, "not only in their coverage of the general news, but in producing news of special depth and authority due to the fact that they had quick access to presidents, Cabinet members and the leaders of Congress."

At the time of his death in 1958, the New York Times called him "a spear that knew no brother" (referring to his disregard for having "friends in the Senate").

In 1997, the Baltimore Sun said of Kent:

Before "Crossfire" and "The McLaughlin Group," before Germond-Witcover, before Robert Novak and William Safire, before Sam and George and Cokie and even before David, before "Meet the Press" with Tim Russert, even before "Meet the Press" with Lawrence Spivak, there was – Frank R. Kent ... who more or less invented "inside-the-Beltway" journalism in the 1920s and honed it into its present-day shape and sharpness in the 1930s.

In the 1990s, House Speaker Newt Gingrich argued that Frank Kent should serve as the model for Washington journalists because Kent genuinely liked politicians and understood them as human beings.

== Works ==
Kent's book The Great Game of Politics (1924) was an influential statement that influenced V. O. Key Jr. and the "behavioral school of politics". Kent explained the real rules of the game of politics as actually played by politicians.

- The Story of Maryland Politics (1911)
- The Great Game of Politics (1924)
- History of the Democratic Party (1925)
- Political Behavior (1928)
