= June 1958 =

Month in 1958

<<	June 1958					>>
Su	Mo	Tu	We	Th	Fr	Sa
1	2	3	4	5	6	7
8	9	10	11	12	13	14
15	16	17	18	19	20	21
22	23	24	25	26	27	28
29	30

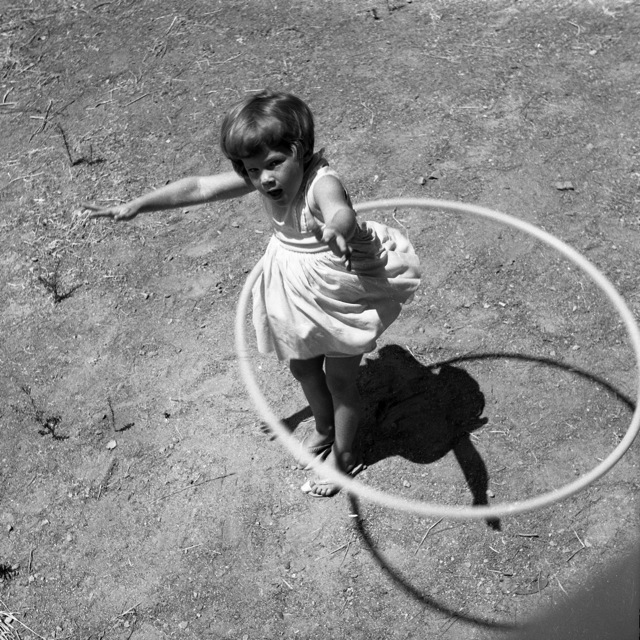
June 16, 1958: Wham-O begins marketing the Hula Hoop

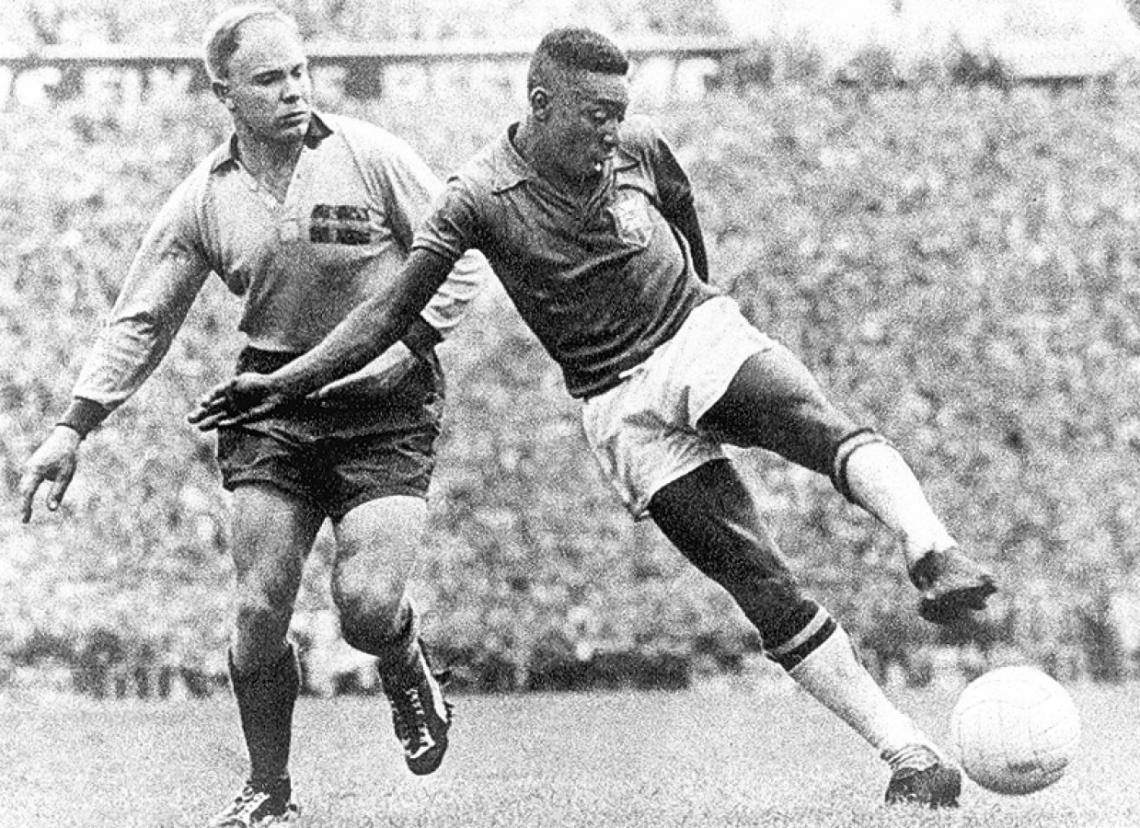
June 29, 1958: Brazil wins 5 to 2 over Sweden to capture the World Cup, with two goals from 17-year old rookie forward Pelé in Stockholm

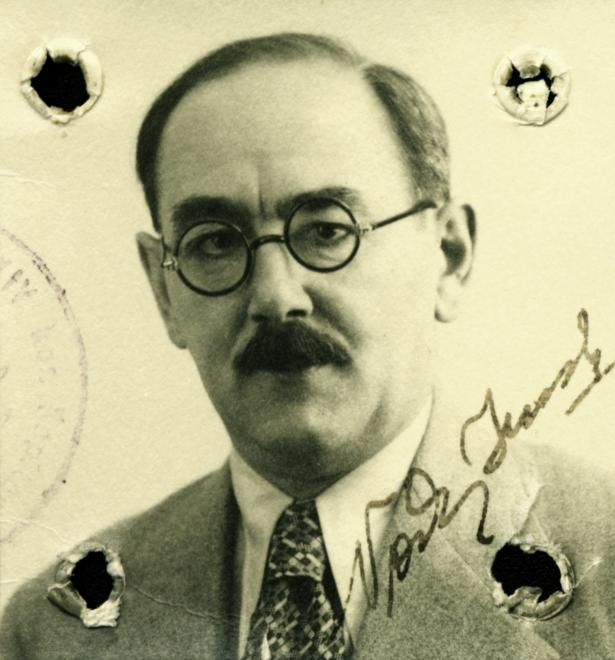
June 16, 1958: Former Hungarian Premier Imre Nagy hanged by Communist government

The following events occurred in June 1958:

== June 1, 1958 (Sunday) ==
- French Army General Charles de Gaulle, who had retired after World War II to Colombey-les-Deux-Églises, was asked by President Coty to form a government as Prime Minister of France to restore order as a civil war was approaching. France's National Assembly approved De Gaulle's return by a vote of 329 to 224. In return for accepting the job, de Gaulle said that he wanted emergency powers to rule by decree.
- Elections were held in Sweden for the 231-member Andra kammaren, the Second Chamber or lower house of Sweden's parliament, the Riksdag. Though Prime Minister Tage Erlander's Social Democratic Party (the Socialdemokratiska Arbetareparti or S/SAP) gained five seats, its 111 was still five short of a majority.
- Elections were held in Belgium for the 212-seat Chamber of Representatives and the 106 Senate seats. Prime Minister Achille Van Acker's Belgian Socialist Party and its coalition partner, the Liberal Party both lost seats while the Christian Social Party (PSC-CVP) won 104 seats in the Chamber and won 53 seats in the Senate.
- Elections were held in Albania for slate of candidates for the 188-seat Kuvendi Popullor (the People's Assembly). Albania's Communist government reported that all but 127 of the nation's 788,250 registered voters turned out to show their enthusiastic approval of the Fronti Demokratik legislators.
- Iceland extended its fishing limits to 12 miles (22.2 km).

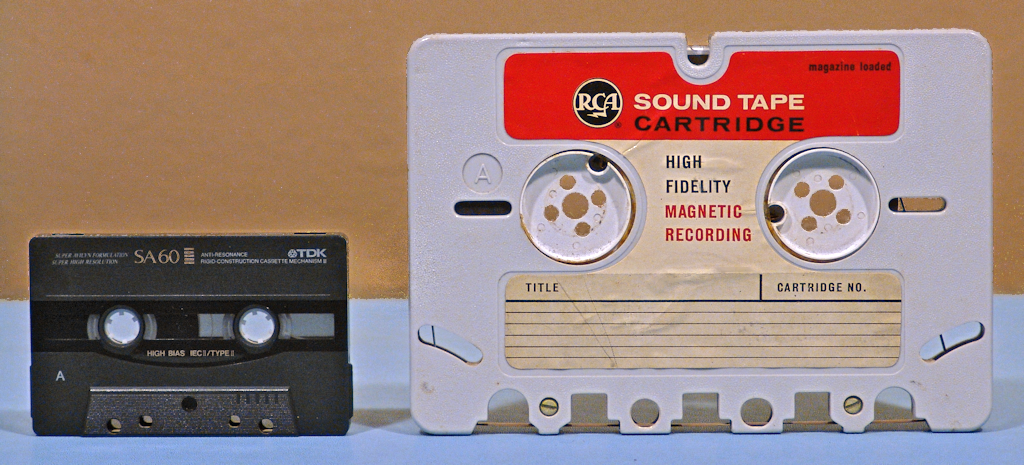
The RCA cartridge next to the smaller improvement

- The RCA tape cartridge, a forerunner of 1963's "compact cassette" that would become the industry standard, was demonstrated in a press conference by the RCA company as the first tape recording system that was enclosed in its own case and saved users from having to thread a tape machine. The "Stereo-Tape Cartridge" was 7 inches (180 mm) long by 5 inches (130 mm) wide (compared to the 4" by 2.5" cassette used later), and its 0.5 inches (13 mm) width tape could only be used on RCA equipment.
- A doubleheader between two Negro American League teams was played at New York City's Yankee Stadium and attracted 9,506 spectators, including scouts from six of the 16 major league teams. The Detroit Clowns beat the Memphis Red Sox, 13 to 3 in the first game and lost the second, 7-6 in six innings.
- Born: Nambaryn Enkhbayar, President of Mongolia from 2005 to 2009, Prime Minister from 2000 to 2004; in Ulaanbaatar.

== June 2, 1958 (Monday) ==
- All 45 people aboard Aeromexico Flight 111 were killed when the Lockheed Constellation crashed shortly after takeoff from Guadalajara with a destination of Mexico City, in the deadliest aviation accident in Mexico up to that time.
- The Royal Federation of Malaya Air Force, later the Royal Malaysian Air Force, was founded from the Malayan Volunteers Air Force that had been a branch of Britain's RAF.
- In San Simeon, California, Hearst Castle opened to the public for guided tours.
- In Washington D.C., Mildred Jeter and Richard Loving were married and then moved back to Central Point, Virginia, where both had been raised. Because Mildred was black and Loving was White, the two were arrested on June 12 for violating Virginia Code §20-59, the state's law against miscegenation and interracial marriage. Convicted of breaking the law, but each receiving a one-year jail sentence, suspended on condition that they leave Virginia until 1984, Mr. and Mrs. Loving left Virginia but, in 1963, would file a motion in the Caroline County court to vacate the sentence. Their appeal would lead to the landmark U.S. Supreme Court decision in Loving v. Virginia, finding unanimously that all state laws against interracial marriage were a violation of the Fourteenth Amendment to the U.S. Constitution. The case would be cited in a 2015 Supreme Court decision, Obergefell v. Hodges, holding that restrictions against same-sex marriage in the U.S. unconstitutional as well.
- Born:
  - Sergey Medvedev, Soviet Russian journalist who later became the press secretary for Russian president Boris Yeltsin; in Kaliningrad, Russian SFSR
  - Lex Luger (ring name for Lawrence Pfohl), American professional wrestler and pro football player; in Buffalo, New York
- Died:
  - Townsend Cromwell, 35, American oceanographer who discovered, in 1952, the Cromwell Current that flows beneath the surface of the Pacific Ocean; in the crash of Aeromexico Flight 111
  - Dr. Carl Fried, 68, German-born Brazilian surgeon and pioneer in radiation therapy

== June 3, 1958 (Tuesday) ==
- By a vote of 350 to 161, France's parliament approved a constitutional law to empower the government of new premier Charles de Gaulle to draft a new constitution and to grant de Gaulle and his cabinet a six month period allowing the government to rule by decree, with some exceptions for basic rights of citizens. De Gaulle had threatened to resign immediately if the emergency power was not granted. The upper house of the parliament, the Council of the Republic voted, 256 to 30, to yield the power to reform the constitution to the De Gaulle government. The new constitution would create the French Fifth Republic, a system of government providing for more power to an elected president.
- Voters in the city of Los Angeles approved "Proposition B" the donation of 352 acres (142 ha) of land in the Chavez Ravine to Brooklyn National League Club, Inc., which had already moved the Brooklyn Dodgers team to Los Angeles prior to the start of the 1958 season, for purposes of building a new stadium. With all votes counted, the site for Dodger Stadium was approved by a margin of 345,435 to 321,142.
- Born: Donatella Damiani (stage name for Donatella Casula), Italian film actress and supermodel; in Naples

== June 4, 1958 (Wednesday) ==
- French prime minister Charles de Gaulle visited Algeria. To the surprise of residents of France, De Gaulle said in a speech in Algiers that French Europeans of Algeria and Muslim Arab Algerians would become full citizens of France with equality of voting.
- Multiple tornadoes killed 28 people in the U.S. state of Wisconsin, with 25 deaths in Dunn County. Hardest hit was the village of Colfax, where 12 people died within the corporate limits.

== June 5, 1958 (Thursday) ==
- The United Kingdom's project to build a supersonic jet fighter was virtually ended by the crash of its prototype Saunders-Roe SR.53 rocket plane, which shut down moments after taking off on its twelfth flight. The test pilot, John Stanley Booth, was killed in the crash.
- After serving as a liaison officer of NACA and as a participating member of an Advanced Research Projects Agency panel, Maxime A. Faget reported to Dr. Hugh Dryden on resulting studies and attending recommendations on the subject of human spaceflight. He stated that the Advanced Research Projects Agency panel was aware that the responsibility for such a program might be placed with the soon-to-be-created civilian space agency, although they recommended program management be placed with the U.S. Air Force under executive control of NACA and the Advanced Research Projects Agency. The panel also recommended that the program start immediately even though the specific manager was, as yet, unassigned. The Advanced Research Projects Agency suggested a system based on the Atlas launch vehicle with the Atlas-Sentry system serving as backup; retrorockets were to be used to initiate return from orbit; the spacecraft was to be non-lifting, ballistic type, and the crew was to be selected from qualified volunteers in the U.S. Army, U.S. Navy, and U.S. Air Force.
- Born: Ahmed Abdallah Mohamed Sambi, President of Comoros 2006 to 2011; in Mutsamudu
- Died:
  - Evelyn Ellis, 64, African-American stage actress on Broadway and theatrical director
  - Saint John of Valamo, 85, Russian-born monk canonized in 2018 in the Eastern Orthodox Church

== June 6, 1958 (Friday) ==
- As part of the policy of apartheid and the new Group Areas Act 1957, the city of Pretoria, executive capital of South Africa, ordered the transfer of South Africans of Indian descent to relocate out of the White Areas of Pretoria and to the newly-created township of Laudium.
- In a speech to supporters in Oran, where French Army officers had led a coup d'etat against the existing French government, Prime Minister de Gaulle declared his support for maintaining Algeria and its European-minority government as a part of Metropolitan France, proclaiming "Vive l'Algérie française!" (Long live French Algeria). He repeated the sentiment later in the day in Mostaganem. Nevertheless, de Gaulle would later change his stance and support the independence of Algeria as a republic ruled by the area's Arab majority.
- China Medical College, later China Medical University, was established in the city of Taichung.
- The Detroit Tigers put an African-American player on the field for the first time, 11 years after Jackie Robinson had integrated Major League Baseball, as Ozzie Virgil Sr. (who had been an MLB player for almost two years with the Giants) was put in at third base in an away game against the Washington Senators. Virgil had one hit in five times at bat and scored one run in an 11 to 2 win.
- Died:
  - Lloyd Hughes, 60, American film actor
  - Virginia Pearson, 72, American stage and film actress

== June 7, 1958 (Saturday) ==
- In a landmark date in medical imaging, the British medical journal The Lancet published the paper "Investigation of Abdominal Masses by Pulsed Ultrasound", by obstetricians Dr. Ian Donald and John MacVicar, and medical physicist T. G. Brown detailing the first use of medical ultrasound for diagnosing problems of an unborn child still in the womb.
- Tim Tam, the thoroughbred racehorse who had won the Kentucky Derby and the Preakness, seemed poised to be the first winner of U.S. horse racing's Triple Crown as the favorite (with 3-20 odds) in the Belmont Stakes, but broke a sesamoid bone and went lame a quarter of a mile before the finish line. Tim Tam, whose racing career was ended, placed second to Cavan, who had not run in the Derby or the Preakness.
- After an angry meeting with officials in Stockholm, the People's Republic of China withdrew from FIFA, the governing body for soccer [football], in protest of FIFA's admission of a team from Taiwan. The Chinese team had last played in FIFA competition on June 2, 1957, when it lost to Indonesia, 2-0, in the World Cup qualification tournament.
- Berry Gordy Jr. founded the recording company "Tamla Records" in Detroit. On April 14, 1960, Tamla would be incorporated as the Motown Record Corporation, a portmanteau of Detroit's automotive manufacturing reputation as "The Motor Town".
- The SS Edmund Fitzgerald was launched from the Great Lakes Engineering Works shipyard at River Rouge, Michigan. At 729 feet (222 m) in length, she would be the largest freighter on the North American Great Lakes for more than a dozen years, but eventually go down with her crew of 29 in 1975.
- Born: Prince (stage name for Prince Rogers Nelson), American rock musician, inductee into the Rock and Roll Hall of Fame; in Minneapolis, Minnesota (d. of drug overdose, 2016)

== June 8, 1958 (Sunday) ==
- Burma's prime minister U Nu survived a motion of no confidence in his government by a margin of only eight votes, 127 to 119. Nu would remain in office a little more than four months before resigning on October 27 to transfer power to Burmese Army General Ne Win.
- Voting was held for 160 of the 320 seats of France's Conseil de la République, the upper house of the French parliament during the Fourth French Republic.
- Rear Admiral Americo Thomaz was elected president of Portugal, defeating Air Force General Humberto Delgado, who had pledged to fire the most powerful person in Portugal, Prime Minister António de Oliveira Salazar. In the election, believed by several independent observers to have been fraudulent, Thomaz won by a 3 to 1 margin over the popular Delgado. After the 1958 election, Salazar decreed that the president would be elected by the National Assembly rather than by direct popular vote.
- David Isom broke the color line by swimming at Florida's Spa pool. The pool was "white only", so he, a black man, was not allowed to swim there. The manager drained the pool and closed the facility.
- Born: Larisa Kislinskaya, Russian journalist and newspaper columnist who went from cultural reports for the Soviet Union to becoming an investigative reporter (d. 2022)

== June 9, 1958 (Monday) ==
- All 24 people aboard an Aeroflot Ilyushin Il-12 airliner were killed in Russia when the plane flew into the side of a hill as it was making its approach to Magadan at the end of a flight from Okhotsk.
- Died:
  - Robert Donat, 53, English film star and 1939 Academy Award winner for Best Actor for Goodbye, Mr. Chips, died from cerebral thrombosis caused by a brain tumor.
  - Fido, 16, celebrated Italian dog known for his loyalty in waiting more than 14 years for his deceased owner to return home; a monument in his honor was erected in the town of Borgo San Lorenzo

== June 10, 1958 (Tuesday) ==
- The New York Convention, officially the Convention on the Recognition and Enforcement of Foreign Arbitral Awards, was adopted by the United Nations and opened for signature. The agreement, which set the beginning for international arbitration of legal disputes between parties from different nations, requires the courts of member nations to give legal effect to decisions where both sides submitted a conflict for arbitration. It would enter into force on June 7, 1959.
- A tornado swept through the town of El Dorado, Kansas and killed 13 people and injured 57.

== June 11, 1958 (Wednesday) ==
- The Daily News, New York City's most-read newspaper, broke the story that White House Chief of Staff Sherman Adams was under investigation by a U.S. House of Representatives Special Subcommittee on Legislative Oversight. Two days later, U.S. president Eisenhower's press secretary, James C. Hagerty, was asked about rumors that Adams had accepted expensive gifts from a friend, Bernard Goldfine, despite federal law prohibiting the practice. According to the New York Daily News, Adams had accepted a $2,400 Oriental rug (equivalent to in price to $24,000 sixty years later). Another reporter asked about a $700 vicuna wool coat and $2,000 of bills that Goldfine had paid for Adams for stays at Boston's Sheraton Plaza hotel. The scandal would force Adams, who had been the chief aide from the start of Eisenhower's presidency, to resign.
- United Nations Security Council Resolution 128 was passed, 10 votes to none (with the Soviet Union abstaining rather than voting in favor or using its veto power), bringing the UN into the civil war in Lebanon. The resolution authorized the creation of the United Nations Observation Group in Lebanon (UNOSIL), a nonmilitary international group to verify that outside aid was not being provided to either side from beyond Lebanon's borders. A military intervention by the U.S. would follow on July 15.
- The capital of the French colony and future West African republic of Senegal was moved from Saint-Louis to Dakar.
- The Vikings, an action and historical film that was released by Curtleigh Productions (owned by actors Tony Curtis and Janet Leigh), premiered at New York City at the Astor Theatre and the Victoria Theatre, and became a worldwide hit after its general release in August.

== June 12, 1958 (Thursday) ==
- The Legislative Assembly of French Cameroon, a United Nations trust territory in West Africa under the administration of France, approved a resolution asking the government of France to accord independence. On November 12, France would ask the UN to grant independence and end the Trusteeship, and French Cameroon (which would later unify with the British Southern Cameroons colony) would become an independent nation on January 1, 1960.
- The Turkish Resistance Organisation (Türk Mukavemet Teşkilatı or TMT) in Cyprus carried out the massacre of eight Greek Cypriot men who had been arrested by Britain's Royal Horse Guards for trespassing on Turkish Cypriot territory in the village of Skylloura. The eight men, all Greek Cypriot residents of the northern Cyprus village of Kondemenos, had been released by the British authorities in the town of Gönyeli, a Turkish Cypriot town on the Turkish side of the island.
- Members of the lower house of Japan's parliament, the Shūgiin, voted along party lines to re-elect Nobusuke Kishi as Prime Minister of Japan.
- The Italian Republic's third parliament opened its session with 596 members of the Chamber of Deputies and 246 members of the Italian Senate. The legislature would continue to meet until May 15, 1963.
- The English Tiddlywinks Association (ETwA) was created by students at Christ's College within the University of Cambridge to serve as the supreme rulemaking and tournament-coordinating body of the game of tiddlywinks.

== June 13, 1958 (Friday) ==
- A treaty was signed between the Communist nations of Czechoslovakia and Poland to permanently end the border conflicts that had existed since World War II after Czechoslova territory, transferred to Polish control in 1938, was returned to Czechoslovakia. The two nations agreed to the boundaries that had existed on January 1, 1938, before the Munich Agreement had divided Czechoslovakia along ethnic lines. Poland dropped claims to Cieszyn Silesia (Slask Cieszynski, now part of the Czech Republic), as well as the Slovak territories of Arva (Orawa) and Spiš (Spisz), while Czechoslovakia dropped claims to Kłodzko and Racibórz. Foreign Minister Adam Rapacki signed on behalf of the Polish People's Republic and his counterpart, Václav David signed for the Czechoslovak Republic.
- Died: Pierre-Étienne Flandin, 69, former prime minister of France 1934–1935 and then for two months in 1940–1941 for Nazi-occupied Vichy France

== June 14, 1958 (Saturday) ==
- The People's Republic of China released two imprisoned American Roman Catholic priests, Reverend Joseph P. McCormack and Reverend Cyril P. Wagner, after both had served five years' incarceration on convictions of espionage. A third priest, James Edward Walsh, had been given an exit visa but refused to leave because he wanted to continue his ministry in Shanghai, and would remain until 1970. McCormack and Wagner departed China on a British ship, Changsha, on June 18. Four other Americans, John T. Downey, Hugh F. Redmond, Richard C. Facteau, and Robert E. Cann, remained incarcerated.
- Britain's BBC television network began showing The Black and White Minstrel Show, a popular variety show that would run for 20 seasons, despite its use of white singers in blackface (billed as "The Mitchell Minstrels") and no players of African descent. The show's comedy was based on American minstrel shows and featured stereotypes of African-American speech and manners.
- Born: Eric Heiden, American speed skater with five Olympic gold medals; in Madison, Wisconsin

== June 15, 1958 (Sunday) ==
- Maria Teresa de Filippis of Italy became the first woman to drive in a Formula One race when she appeared in the 1958 Belgian Grand Prix. She finished in 10th place, ahead of nine other cars that failed to finish the race.
- The Taça de Portugal, the national cup tournament for the Portuguese Football Federation, was won by FC Porto, 1 to 0, over S. L. Benfica at the Estádio Nacional in the Lisbon suburb of Oeiras. Porto had finished second and Benfica third during the Primeira Divisão soccer football league season.
- Born:
  - Wade Boggs, American baseball third baseman and inductee to Baseball Hall of Fame; in Omaha, Nebraska
  - Yvonne Fletcher, London Metropolitan Police officer who lost her life in 1984 after being shot by a gunman who had fired from inside the Libyan Embassy; in Semley, Wiltshire (d. 1984)

== June 16, 1958 (Monday) ==
- In Hungary, former prime minister Imre Nagy, former Defense Minister Pál Maléter, journalist Miklós Gimes, and Lieutenant Colonel József Szilágyi were all executed for treason for their roles in the Hungarian Revolution of 1956. The trial, verdict and sentences were not announced until afterward. Four other persons received prison sentences ranging from 5 to 12 years, and a life sentence was meted out for author Sándor Kopácsi. According to later reports, Nagy, Gimes and Szilagyi were all hanged while General Maleter was shot.
- The Wham-O toy company began marketing of the "Hula hoop", a 110 cm (42 in) diameter hoop made from Marlex plastic, with the earliest known advertisement for the "Hula-Hoop by Wham-O" being placed by "The Broadway" chain of department stores in Los Angeles, for sale for $1.98 (equivalent to $20 more than 60 years later). With giveaways, national marketing and retailing, a fad would spread eastward across the United States.
- The U.S. Supreme Court ruled in the case of Kent v. Dulles, 5 to 4, that the U.S. State Department could not withhold issuing passports to Americans based on suspicion of disloyalty to the U.S., invalidating a federal regulation on grounds that it was not authorized by Congress. The Court avoided the question of whether such a regulation would be unconstitutional. The State Department responded to the Kent decision on June 24 by removing questions about Communist Party membership from its passport applications and issuing passports to those persons who had left the answer blank.
- A Cruzeiro do Sul airliner in Brazil crashed, killing all but five passengers out of a total of 26 people on board. The Convair CV-440 was approaching Curitiba at the end of a flight from Florianópolis. The dead included former president Nereu Ramos, who had served as the interim president for 10 weeks in 1955 and 1956.

== June 17, 1958 (Tuesday) ==
- Chinua Achebe's landmark novel Things Fall Apart was released by the British publisher Heinemann.
- In Canada, the collapse of the Second Narrows Bridge in Vancouver killed 19 ironworkers after several spans fell into the waters of the Burrard Inlet and drowned. Another 80 workers fell in the collapse but survived.
- Danish protesters in Copenhagen smashed the windows of the Soviet Union's Embassy to Denmark in protest over the execution of former Hungarian premier Imre Nagy. A counterdemonstration was made three days later by Russian protesters who smashed windows at Denmark's embassy in Moscow, with no intervention from local police. More violent protests took place later between the Soviet and West German embassies in Moscow and Bonn.
- Born:
  - Jello Biafra (stage name for Eric Boucher), American punk rock musician for the Dead Kennedys; in Boulder, Colorado
  - K. M. Joseph, Indian jurist and Supreme Court of India Judge since 2014; in Kottayam, Kerala state
- Died:
  - Juan Ferrero, 40, Spanish bodybuilder who had won the professional Mr. Universe competition in 1952, was killed in a car accident in Bordeaux in France when the automobile he was riding in overturned on a curve.
  - Patriarch Alexandros III, 87, spiritual leader of the Greek Orthodox Patriarchate of Antioch and All the East since 1928. He would be succeeded by Theodosius VI on November 14, 1958.

== June 18, 1958 (Wednesday) ==
- A major change in the Soviet Union's agricultural policy regarding collective farms was approved by the Central Committee of the Soviet Communist Party at the direction of General Secretary Nikita Khrushchev. In addition to forgiving all outstanding debts owed to the government by farms for equipment, the Party eliminated the policy of "compulsory deliveries" of a percentage of produce at nominal prices and paying the same price to farms at the same rate of all "state purchases".
- Ceylon (now Sri Lanka), established diplomatic relations with the People's Republic of China.
- The first supermarket in New Zealand was opened, as grocers Tom Ah Chee, Norman Kent, and John Brown introduced an American-style grocery store to launch Foodtown, with the first store opening at the Auckland suburb of Otahuhu. The supermarkets would be rebranded in 2011 as part of the Countdown chain of discount groceries.
- The Trans Canada Microwave communications relay system of 139 towers from coast to coast transmitted its first telephone and television signals, and was declared fully operational on July 1.
- Benjamin Britten's one-act opera Noye's Fludde premiered at the Aldeburgh Festival.
- Died: Douglas Jardine, 57, English cricketer and captain of the England national team in The Ashes in 1932 and 1933, died of cancer

== June 19, 1958 (Thursday) ==
- In India, the top of the Himalayan mountain Mrigthuni was reached for the first time. Mountaineer Gurdial Singh and four other members of the Indian team reached the summit of 22,490 feet (6,850 m).
- Born: Sergei Makarov, Soviet Russian ice hockey star; in Chelyabinsk, Russian SFSR, Soviet Union
- Died: Jack Westrope, 40, American thoroughbred jockey later inducted to the National Museum of Racing and Hall of Fame, was fatally injured in the running of the Hollywood Oaks at Hollywood Park near Los Angeles. Westrope was moving into the lead on the filly Well Away when the horse struck the inner rail and he was hurled at high speed onto the structure.

== June 20, 1958 (Friday) ==
- Mir Ahmad Yar Khan Ahmedzai, the former monarch of the British Indian princely state of Kalat before the independence of Pakistan in 1947, declared the Pakistani province of Baluchistan to be an independent nation. Ahmedzai's rebellion would last only three months, before his arrest on October 6 by local police.
- Voting was held for both houses of the Bolivian Congress, with 34 of the 68 seats in the Chamber of Deputies and six of the 18 Bolivian Senate seats at stake. The Revolutionary Nationalist Movement won all but two deputy races and all six of the Senate seats.
- Born: U.S. Army General Mark Milley, Chairman of the Joint Chiefs of Staff from 2015 to 2019; in Winchester, Massachusetts
- Died:
  - Kurt Alder, 55, German chemist and 1950 Nobel prize in Chemistry laureate for his work in discovering the Diels–Alder reaction
  - Herbert Bayard Swope, 76, U.S. newspaper journalist and three-time Pulitzer Prize winner for his reporting, later an editor for the New York World

== June 21, 1958 (Saturday) ==
- A U.S. District Court judge in Arkansas issued an order allowing the school board of Little Rock a two-and-a-half year delay in implementing racial desegregation of its schools, allowing Central High School to revert to its all-white status for the 1958-1959, 1959-1960 and 1960-1961 school years. The seven remaining African-American students at Central High were to be denied from returning to the school in the autumn. Judge Harry J. Lemley wrote, "... While the Negro students at Little Rock have a personal interest in being admitted to the public schools on a nondiscriminatory basis as soon as practicable, that interest is only one factor of the equation," adding "there is also another public interest involved, eliminating or at least ameliorating the unfortunate racial strife and tension which existed in Little Rock during the past year and still exists there."
- The Astrological Association of Great Britain was founded.
- Born: Reema Lagoo (stage name for Nayan Bhadbhade), Indian stage and film actress; in Bombay (now Mumbai); (d. of heart attack, 2017)
- Died:
  - Herbert Brenon, 78, Irish-born U.S. film director noted for 1928's Beau Geste and Neptune's Daughter
  - Yvonne Dubel, 76, French operatic soprano

== June 22, 1958 (Sunday) ==
- The first coronation ceremony in Norway was held in more than 50 years after being eliminated by an amendment of the constitution in 1908. King Olav V, who had ascended the throne on September 21, had convinced the government of Prime Minister Einar Gerhardsen that an event should be held to acknowledge the King's commencement of duties as head of the Church of Norway, if not the nation's monarch. For the "Signing til kongsgjerning" ("Blessing of the King's Reign"), King Olav sat upon the coronation throne in Trondheim to listen to a sermon, after which he knelt as Bishop Arne Fjellbu recited a prayer while placing a hand upon the King's head. No crown was used.
- Born:
  - Rocío Banquells, Mexican pop singer and actress; in Monterrey, Nuevo León
  - Rodion Cămătaru, Romanian soccer football striker with 73 caps for the Romanian National Team; in Strehaia
  - Bruce Campbell, American film and TV actor; in Royal Oak, Michigan
- Died:
  - Frances Kyle, 64, Northern Irish barrister and the first woman (along with Averil Deverell) to practice law in the United Kingdom, being admitted to the Bar of Ireland in 1921, and in 1922 to Great Britain.
  - Reverend A. E. Robertson, 87, Scottish minister and mountain climber

== June 23, 1958 (Monday) ==
- Almost 100 people were killed in the explosion of two fireworks stands in a crowded outdoor market in the Brazilian city of Santo Amaro, Bahia and 300 injured as people were preparing to celebrate "O Nascimento de João Batista", or St. John's Day, the June 24 honoring of the nativity of John the Baptist.
- A mob of hundreds of rioters in Moscow attacked West Germany's Embassy in the Soviet Union, in apparent retaliation for demonstrations against the Soviet Union in West Germany's capital, Bonn, a week earlier. The crowd smashed 40 large windows and hurled stones, bricks, chunks of iron, bottles and burning rags at the building. The attack went on for two hours with no intervention by police.
- In a 7 to 2 decision, the U.S. Supreme Court published Miller v. United States, holding that a person cannot lawfully be arrested in one's home without the officers first giving notice of their authority and purpose. Because evidence seized in the raid by federal agents in the home of an accused drug dealer, 17-year-old William Miller of Washington D.C., was done without a warrant or an announcement of why the law enforcement agents were at his home, the evidence seized from Miller and two of his partners was not admissible and the charges were dismissed.

== June 24, 1958 (Tuesday) ==
- Inventor Marus C. Logan of the Thomas & Betts electrical supply company applied for the patent for the first "zip tie", which would be marketed under the brand name Ty-Rap. Logan was awarded U.S. patent #3,022,557 on February 27, 1962.
- Born:
  - Tommy "Tiny" Lister, American film actor and professional wrestler; in Marina del Rey, California (d. 2020 from a heart attack)
  - John "Jean" Caret, Canadian politician who served as Deputy Prime Minister of Canada for three months in 1993 and later as Premier of Quebec from 2003 to 2012; in Sherbrooke, Quebec
- Died: George Orton, 85, Canadian distance runner and the first athlete to overcome a disability to win an Olympic medal, winning the gold medal in the 1900 Olympic 2,500-meter steeplechase after getting the bronze in the 400-meter hurdles.

== June 25, 1958 (Wednesday) ==
- The U.S. Air Force announced the selection of nine men who would serve as the first American astronauts in the Air Force's Man in Space Soonest ("MISS") program, to be launched into orbit on a Thor rocket. Only one of the nine, Neil Armstrong, would reach outer space in a rocket, and none of the others would be picked for the NASA Astronaut Corps. Two others, Robert Michael White and Joseph A. Walker, would fly the experimental North American X-15 spaceplane above 100 kilometres (62 mi). Captain Iven Carl Kincheloe Jr. was killed in a plane crash 31 days after his selection was announced. The MISS program was canceled on August 1 after the creation of NASA.
- Elections were held for the 21 seats of the Staten van Suriname in Surinam, at the time commonly called the colony of Dutch Guiana. Severinus Emanuels of the National Party was sworn in the same day as the Prime Minister of Suriname.
- Two people were killed and 35 seriously injured in a fiery collision on the East River of a cargo vessel and an oil tanker, and the Manhattan Bridge in New York City was damaged. Shortly after midnight, the Swedish freighter Nebraska was traveling south and the tanker Empress Bay was headed north with a cargo of 280,000 US gallons (1,100,000 L; 230,000 imp gal) of gasoline from a refinery when the tanker made a sudden right turn into the path of the freighter and was struck, causing the tanker to explode and then to sink. All 42 of the crew of the Nebraska were able to escape to safety by jumping to the FDNY fireboat Gaynor that had come to the rescue.
- Born: Serik Akhmetov, Prime Minister of Kazakhstan from 2012 to 2014; in Temirtau, Kazakh SSR, Soviet Union

== June 26, 1958 (Thursday) ==
- In the North Sulawesi province, Indonesian Army troops recaptured the city of Manado, capital of the rebel government set up by Permesta, two days after the rebel government had evacuated the city following eight days of fierce fighting. The rebels relocated their capital to the city of Tomohon.
- Surya Wonowidjojo founded the Indonesian cigarette manufacturer Gudang Garam Tbk, which he would build into a multi-million-dollar operation. Wonowidjojo's son, Rachman Halim, became the Gudang Garam CEO in 1984 and expanded it into a conglomerate, eventually becoming a billionaire and the richest man in Indonesia.
- The small city of Riehen, located Basel-Stadt canton, broke centuries of tradition and became the first locality in Switzerland to allow women the right to vote. On September 29, Trudy Späth-Schweizer would become the first Swiss woman elected to public office, serving on the city council.
- Gaston Eyskens formed a new government as Prime Minister of Belgium, replacing Achille Van Acker after Van Acker's Socialist-Liberal coalition had lost its plurality of seats in the June 1 elections.
- Cuban rebels led by Raúl Castro began the taking of North American hostages, kidnapping 10 American and two Canadian mining company employees. The next day, the Cubans kidnapped 24 U.S. servicemen who had been on leave from the Guantanamo Bay Naval Base. All the hostages were treated well, and would ultimately be released, starting with four American civilians and one Canadian civilian on July 2.
- The 71-year-old iron barque Omega, a Peruvian sailing ship and freighter that had been built in Liverpool in 1887 as the British ship Drumcliff, sank after springing a leak. As the world's last full-rigged ship trading under sail alone, the ship sank while carrying a cargo of guano from the Pachacamac Islands for Huacho. The ship's captain, Juan Anibal Escobar Hurtado, was accused by the Peruvian government of deliberately sinking the ship and was never cleared, despite his efforts to show that the sinking was due to the ship's age and poor maintenance.
- Born:
  - Pedro Cateriano, Prime Minister of Peru for three weeks in 2020; in Lima
  - Suresh Gopi, Indian film actor and National Film Award winner; in Kollam, Kerala state

== June 27, 1958 (Friday) ==
- The Indian Tamil language musical film Maalaiyitta Mangai premiered.
- A U.S. Air Force C-118 airplane, with nine crew aboard, flew 106 miles (171 km) into Soviet airspace after crossing the U.S.S.R.'s border with Turkey into the Armenian SSR and was captured in the Azerbaijan SSR near Yevlakh. According to a protest note delivered to the U.S. Ambassador in Moscow, two Soviet fighters signaled the American plane to follow them to the nearest landing field and "The intruder did not comply." The plane finally landed "on Soviet territory 240 kilometres (150 mi) from the place where it violated the state frontier of the Soviet Union and burned up", apparently from the crew's destruction of the plane after departing. Five of the U.S. airmen were beaten by angry Russian peasants shortly after parachuting to the ground and one, Major Bennie A. Shupe, was confronted by a lynch mob, commenting later that "They threw a rope over the crossarm of a telephone pole. I have no doubt they were going to hang me." Shupe said that after he made it clear that he was an American, the mob backed off and Soviet soldiers took the U.S. men into custody, where they were treated well. The nine men would be released on July 7 and transported to the Iranian city of Astara on the border between the U.S.S.R.'s Azerbaijan SSR and Iran.
- The Peronist Party became legal again in Argentina.
- An attempt by the U.S. Air Force to set a world speed record for four KC-135 tanker planes resulted in tragedy when the third of the four planes crashed on takeoff from Westover Air Force Base in Springfield, Massachusetts. The airplane stalled, skidded across the Massachusetts Turnpike, and burst into flames, killing all 15 persons aboard, six of whom were newspaper reporters assigned to cover the story.
- The last original episode of The Frank Sinatra Show was telecast on the ABC network in the U.S., after which the superstar singer retired permanently from weekly television shows. Sinatra had been given control over the show and split the 32 episodes into 23 variety shows (14 of them live) and nine dramatic plays, in some of which he acted. The final episode was a play called "The Seedling Doubt", presented by Sinatra as host, but not featuring him as an actor.
- Billy Pierce, pitcher for the Chicago White Sox baseball team, prevented 26 batters from the Washington Senators from reaching first base and was within one batter of pitching a perfect game when pinch hitter Ed Fitz Gerald hit a double to ruin the achievement.
- Born:
  - Magnus Lindberg, Finnish classical music composer; in Helsinki
  - Ahmad Vahidi, Iran's Minister of Defense and later its Interior Minister; as Ahmad Shah Cheraghi in Shiraz

== June 28, 1958 (Saturday) ==
- The government of Cuban dictator Fulgencio Batista launched Operation Verano, a 41-day offensive campaign to stop rebel Fidel Castro. The Operation would prove to be unsuccessful.
- Born: Félix Gray (pen name for Félix Boutboul), Tunisian-born French songwriter the known for the successful French language musical Don Juan; in Tunis
- Died:
  - Mohammad Ismail Khan, 73, Pakistani independence activist who had served as President of the All-India Muslim League from 1930 until Pakistan was created from the Muslim sections of British India as an independent nation in 1947.
  - Alfred Noyes, 77, English poet and playwright

== June 29, 1958 (Sunday) ==
- Brazil beat Sweden, 5 to 2, to win the World Cup in Sweden. 49,737 people watched the game at the Råsunda Stadium, near Stockholm at Solna. Sweden's Nils Liedholm scored the first goal four minutes into play, and Brazil's Vavá (Edvaldo Izidio Neto) tied it up five minutes later, then followed with another goal to make the score 2—1 at the half. In the second half, a 17-year-old forward, Pelé (Edson Arantes do Nascimento), scored goals for Brazil at 55 minutes and in the 90th and final minute. Brazil's Mário Zagallo and Sweden's Agne Simonsson also contributed goals.
- Atlético Bilbao won Spain's annual soccer football championship, the Copa del Generalísimo, 2 to 0 over the regular season's top team, Real Madrid. 100,000 people watched the game at the Estadio Chamartín in Madrid. Bilbao had finished in sixth place in La Liga.
- Born:
  - Rosa Mota, Portuguese long-distance runner and winner of the Olympic women's marathon in 1988; in Porto
  - Hervé Tullet, French illustrator and children's author known for the bestselling book Press Here; in Avranches

== June 30, 1958 (Monday) ==
- The U.S. Senate passed the Alaska Statehood Act, 64 to 20, after the U.S. House of Representatives had approved the proposition. Votes against Alaska's statehood came from 13 Democrats from nine southern states (including both Senators from Arkansas, Georgia, Mississippi, South Carolina and Virginia) and the Republicans of seven different states. U.S. President Eisenhower signed the bill into law on July 7, and Alaska would become the 49th state of the United States on January 3, 1959.
- Both houses of the U.S. Congress passed the US–UK Mutual Defence Agreement, which was signed by President Eisenhower on July 3.
- The Ifni War ended in the Spanish Sahara as the Moroccan Army of Liberation declared a ceasefire in accordance with the Treaty of Angra de Cintra signed on April 1.
- In Taiwan, Yu Hung-chun's resignation as Premier of the Republic of China was accepted by President Chiang Kai-shek. Chiang appointed Vice President Chen Cheng as the new premier.
- Born:
  - Karl Friesen, Canadian-born German ice hockey goaltender; in Winnipeg, Manitoba
  - Esa-Pekka Salonen, Finnish conductor and composer; in Helsinki
  - Irina Vorobieva, Russian pairs skater and 1981 world champion; in Leningrad, Russian SFSR, USSR (d. 2022)
