= May 1958 =

Month of 1958

<<	May 1958					>>
Su	Mo	Tu	We	Th	Fr	Sa
				1	2	3
4	5	6	7	8	9	10
11	12	13	14	15	16	17
18	19	20	21	22	23	24
25	26	27	28	29	30	31

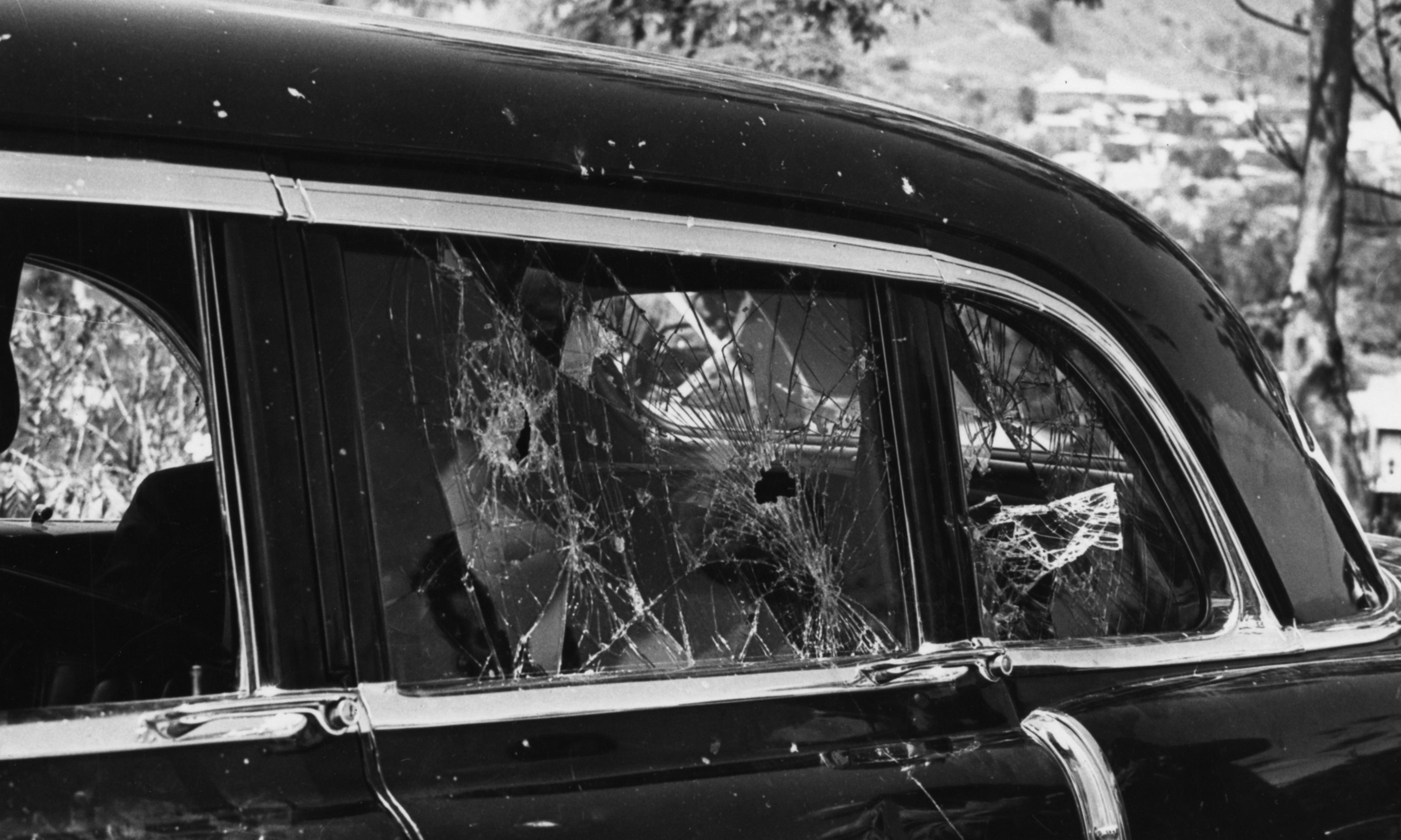
U.S. Vice President's motorcade attacked by mob during visit to Venezuela

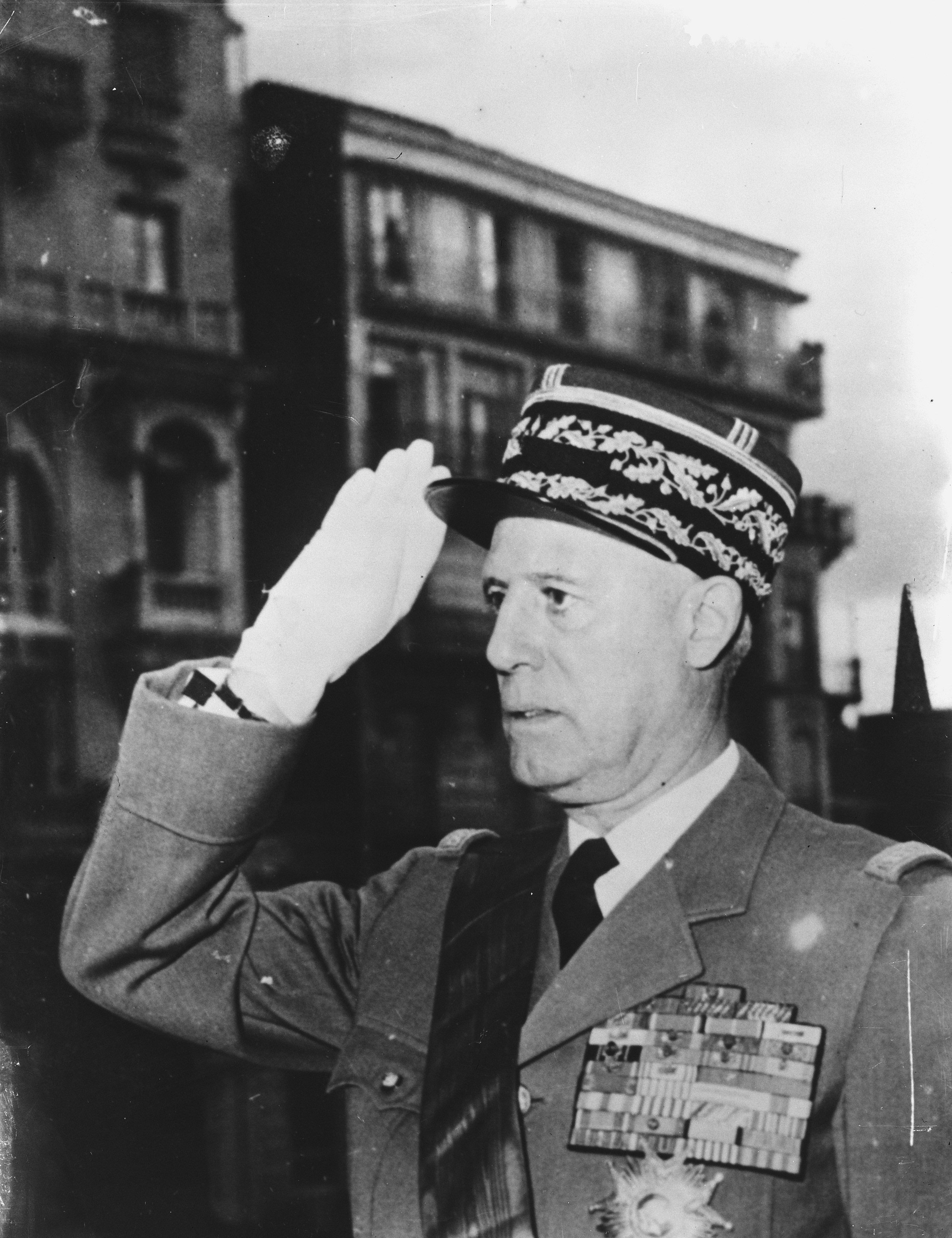
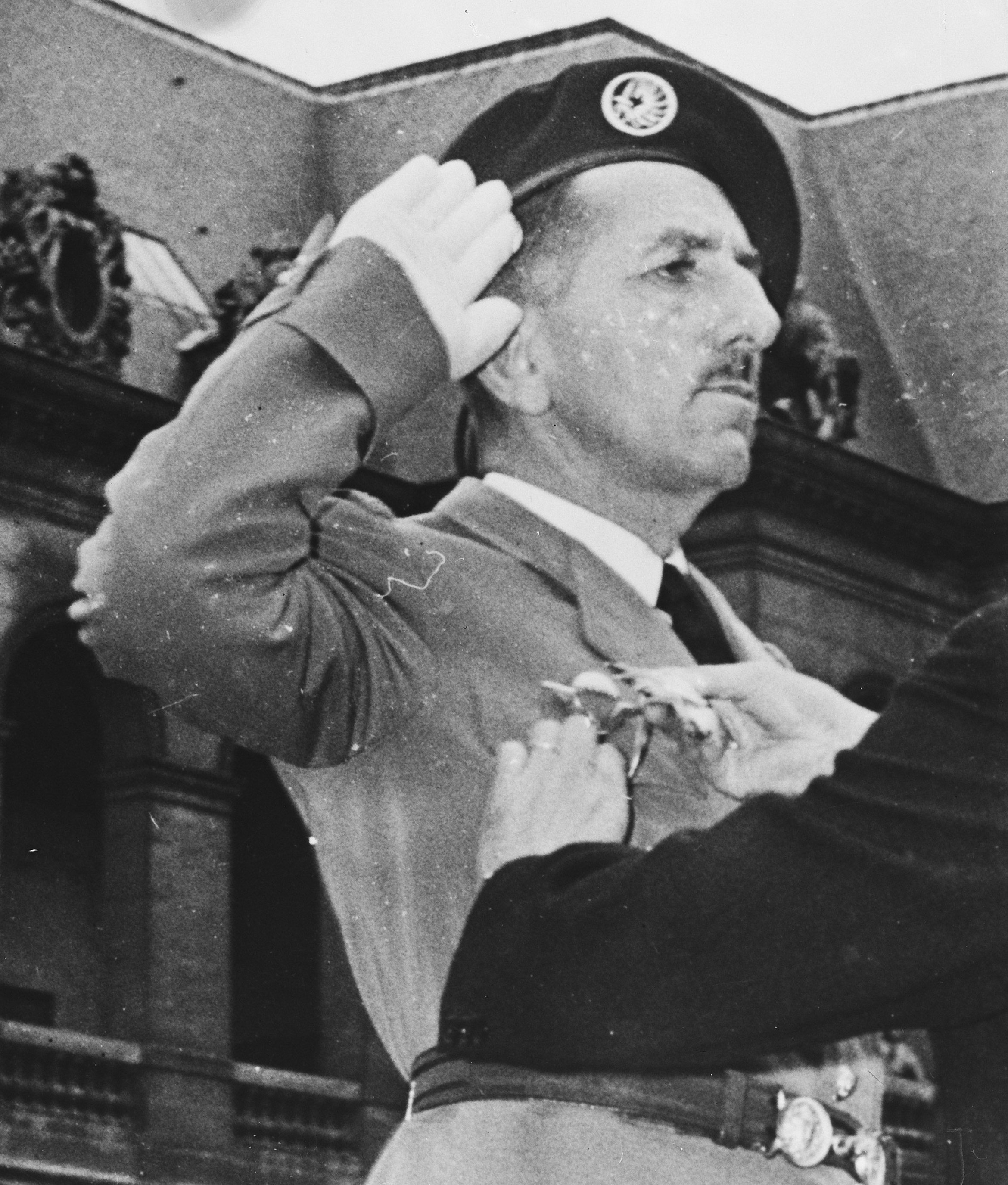
May 13, 1958: French Army Generals Salan and Massu mutiny, seize control French Algeria from France

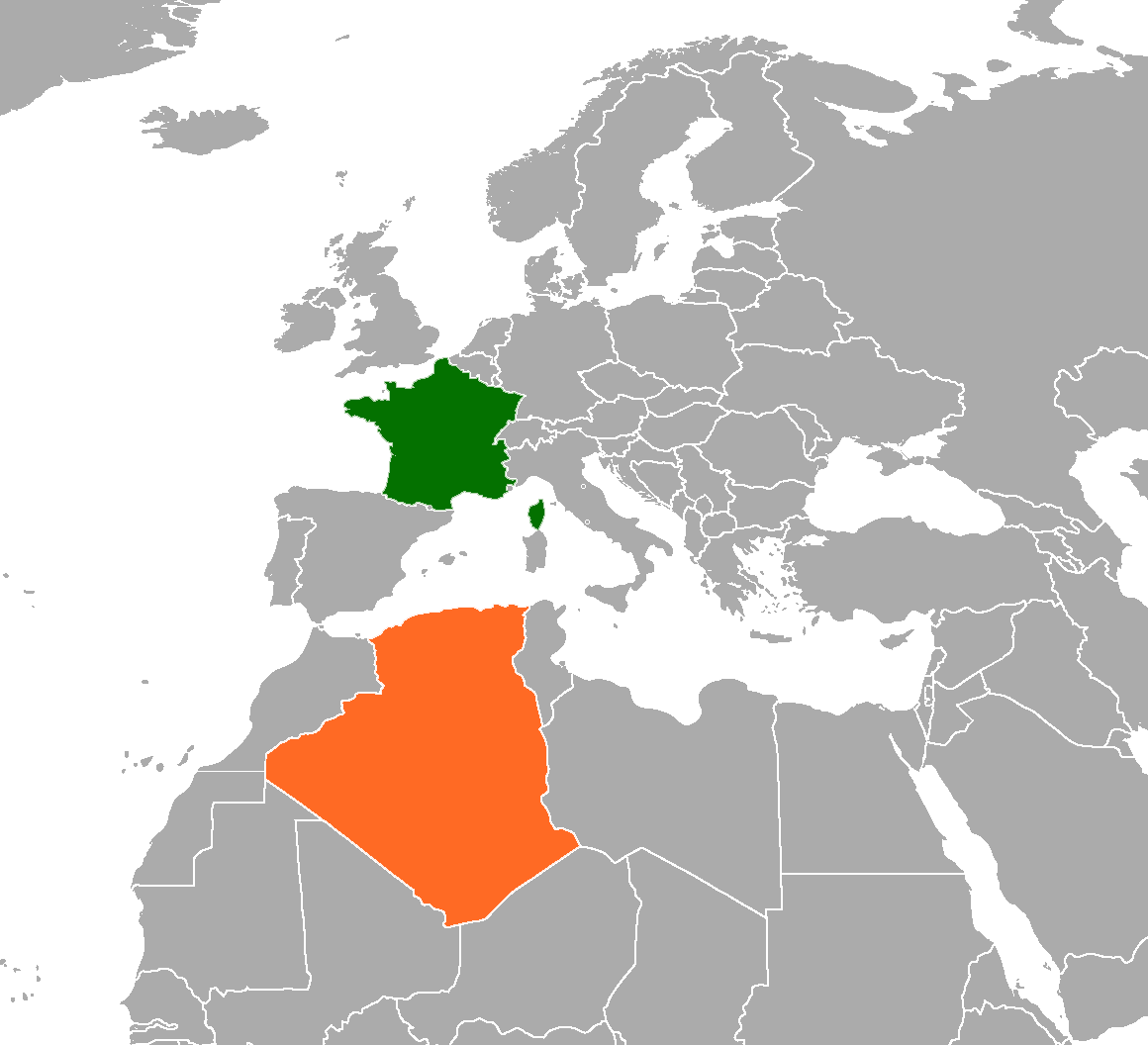
May 13, 1958: French Algeria (orange) declared separate from France (green) by mutinous French Army officers

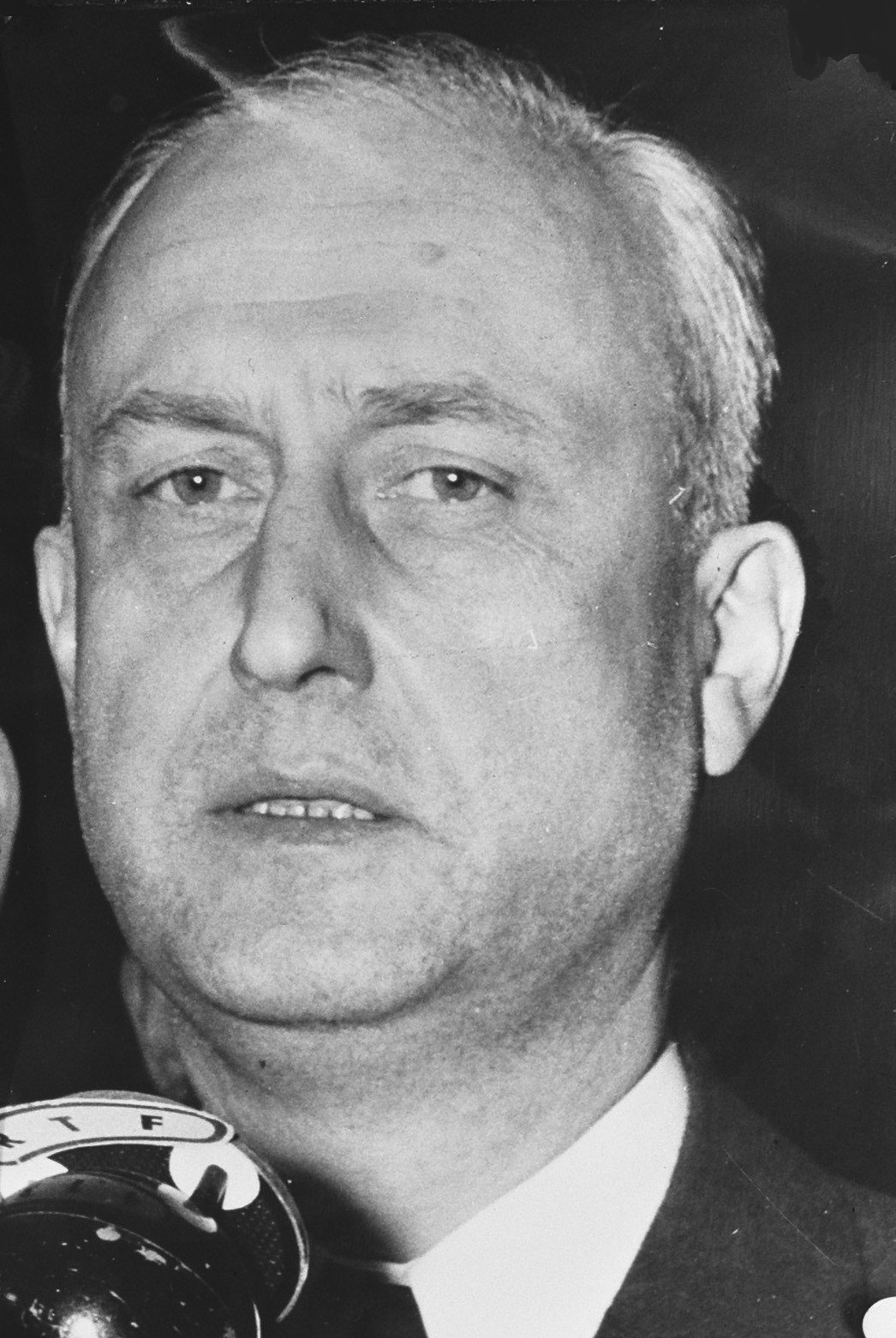
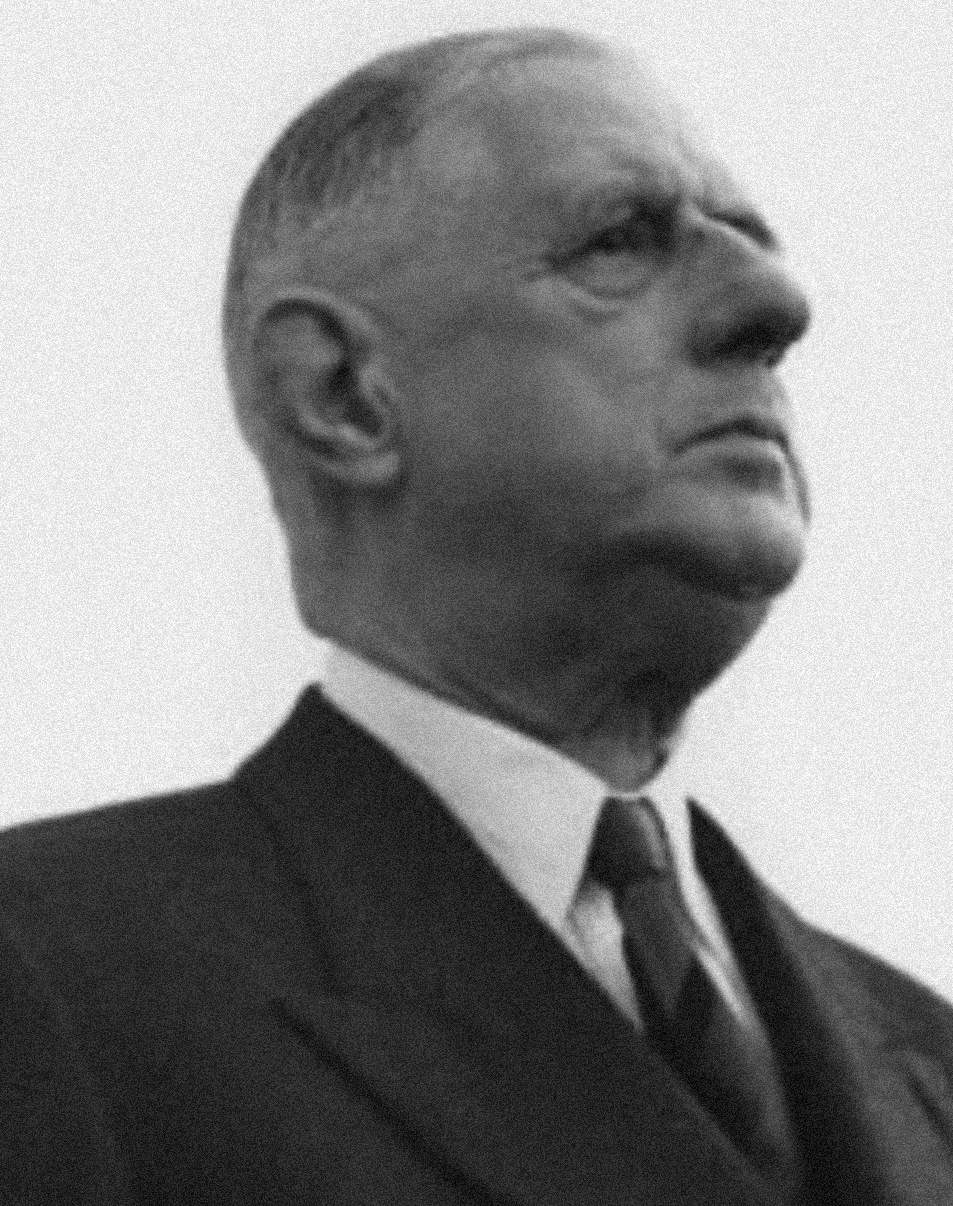
May 28, 1958: Prime Minister Pflimlin of France steps down in crisis to make way for return of General Charles de Gaulle

The following events occurred in May 1958:

== May 1, 1958 (Thursday) ==
- Television broadcasting began in the People's Republic of China as Peking Television at 7:00 in the evening local time with experimental two-hour broadcasts in Beijing. The station moved to three hours and 30 minutes of regular nightly programming on September 2, 1958, and would continue on that schedule for 20 years.
- The Nordic Passport Union came into force after an agreement signed on July 12, 1957, allowing residents of Denmark, Sweden, and Norway to cross through specially approved districts within the member nations without needing to show a passport.
- Arturo Frondizi became President of Argentina.
- U.S. space scientist James van Allen announced the discovery of Earth's magnetosphere. The initial reaction was that what is now called the Van Allen Radiation Belt, located 600 miles (970 km) above the Earth and with radiation 1,000 times more powerful than expected, "raises a new obstacle to manned space flight" and that spacecraft would need to be redesigned to protect against it. "The radiation is so intense," a reporter wrote, "that a space traveler could use up his weekly tolerance dose of radiation in one and a half hours."
- Died: Oscar Torp, Prime Minister of Norway from 1951 to 1955 and the incumbent president of Norway's parliament, the Storting.

== May 2, 1958 (Friday) ==
- The kidnapping of four of the five members of the ruling military junta of Colombia, as well as the expected incoming civilian President, Alberto Lleras Camargo, took place in Bogotá in an attempted coup d'etat by rebels within the armed forces. With two days left before the scheduled May 4 elections, at 4:00 in the morning, Colonel Hernando Forero and rebels within the military police went to the homes of the junta members (Major General Gabriel Paris, who was chairman of junta and the nominal head of state; Major General Deogracias Fonsceca, and Brigadier Generals Luis Ordonez and Rafael Navas Pardo, as well as that of Lleras. The other junta member, Admiral Rubén Piedrahíta, was able to avoid capture and alerted the rest of the Colombian armed forces, who refused to go along with the coup. The rebels surrendered after eight hours and released their hostages. Lleras would take office as expected on August 7.
- Voting was held for the 233 seats of the House of Representatives of South Korea. The Liberal Party or Jayudang, a right-wing party despite its name and led by President Syngman Rhee, retained its majority, winning 126 seats.
- Haiti's National Assembly voted to declare a state of siege in the Caribbean nation and granted emergency powers to the government, as well as authorizing the suspension of constitutional rights and ending parliamentary immunity for its members.
- The United Nations Security Council voted 11 to 1, to approve a proposal to prohibit nuclear weapons from being placed in the area above the Arctic Circle and to allow for international verification of compliance. The lone negative vote came from one of the five permanent members of the Security Council, the Soviet Union, which used its veto power to deny the resolution.
- Died: Henry Cornelius, 44, South African-born British film director

== May 3, 1958 (Saturday) ==
- Tim Tam won the 1958 Kentucky Derby, the first "jewel" of the Triple Crown of American thoroughbred horse racing, and was favored to become the first horse since 1948 to win the Triple Crown.
- England's FA Cup was won by Bolton Wanderers, 2 to 0, over Manchester United, before a crowd of 99,756 at Wembley Stadium in London. Manchester United had only four of the players it had started with the season, in that eight teammates had been killed in a plane crash on February 6, but had reached the finals from a field of 16 teams still remaining after four rounds of play.
- Rioting broke out at a rock concert at the Boston Garden, where New York disc jockey Alan Freed was hosting a live broadcast of his Rock 'n' Roll Party show, and at least 15 people in attendance were robbed or assaulted. A grand jury in Boston indicted Freed a few days later for inciting the unlawful destruction of property.
- Died: Frank Foster, 69, English test cricket star who appeared in 159 first-class matches and 11 test matches, and whose career was cut short by a motorcycle accident

== May 4, 1958 (Sunday) ==
- Voting was held for the 60-seat Sapha Haeng Xat, the lower house of the parliament of the southeast Asian kingdom of Laos. The chamber had been increased by 21 seats since the last election and most of the new seats were won by the Neo Lao Sang Xat (Lao Patriotic Front), a Communist political party of the Pathet Lao and led by Prince Souphanouvong. The moderate Phak Xat Kao Na (National Progressive Party) led by Souphanouvong's half-brother, Prime Minister Souvanna Phouma, lost its 22-of-39 seats majority but retained a plurality of 26 of 60 seats.
- Voters in Colombia overwhelmingly approved the election of Alberto Lleras Camargo, the first president in the South American nation to be nominated by both major political parties, the Conservatives and the Liberals. Another member of the Conservatives, Jorge Leyva, had been put forward by members of the parliament who had not approved of Lleras as a bipartisan candidate. Out of slightly more than three million votes cast, Lleras won 80 percent.
- Real Madrid finished in first place on the final day of the 1957-58 season in Spain's premier soccer football league, La Liga with a record of 20 wins, 5 draws and 5 losses (45 points), three points ahead of Atlético Madrid (with 16 wins and 10 draws for 42 points). Going into the 30th and final game, Real Madrid had already clinched the title after a match the week before where it and Atletico Madrid had played to a 1 to 1 draw.
- Born: Keith Haring, American pop artist and LGBTQ activist; in Reading, Pennsylvania (d. 1990)
- Died: Elaine Sterne Carrington, 66, American writer and producer who in 1932 created the first soap opera, a radio drama series for the NBC Blue network. The program which would become the 15-minute afternoon show Pepper Young's Family, originated as a Sunday night show called Red Adams, before the Beech-Nut Gum manufacturer agreed to become a sponsor conditioned on the change in name to avoid association with a rival product, Adams Gum. Mrs. Carrington wrote the scripts for 12,000 episodes of three different soap operas.

== May 5, 1958 (Monday) ==
- Elections were held in the Kingdom of Iraq for all 145 seats in the Majlis an-Nuwwab, the lower house of the parliament. The races for 118 of the seats were featured unopposed candidates who supported the government. In the other 27 races, independent candidates defeated the pro-government contenders in only five contests. The National Union Front, a coalition of parties that included the Ba'ath Party that would later rule the Middle Eastern nation, boycotted the election.
- Born: Robert "Dipper" DiPierdomenico, Australian rules football midfielder for the Hawthorn Hawks; in Hawthorn, Victoria
- Died:
  - Viscount Ruffside (Douglas Clifton Brown), 78, British politician and Speaker of the House of Commons from 1943 to 1951
  - James Branch Cabell, 79, American novelist,
  - Otto Abetz, 55, German ambassador to France during the Nazi occupation from 1940 to 1944, was killed in a car accident along with his wife. Abetz, who had served five years of a 20-year prison sentence in France after World War II, was a passenger in the car as his wife drove on the autobahn, when she lost control and struck another vehicle head-on near Langenfeld in West Germany, and burned to death.

== May 6, 1958 (Tuesday) ==
- Millions of people in the United States, including U.S. President Dwight D. Eisenhower, went to the fallout shelter nearest to them in a nationwide civil defense drill, Operation Alert 1958. The exercise was held in 46 of the 48 U.S. states, with Michigan and Indiana excused from participation because of pre-scheduled statewide events. At 10:30 Eastern time, sirens signaled that persons outside should look for the nearest shelter as an exercise for the time that a nuclear bomb might be dropped on their area. The drill ended after 10 minutes.
- The last execution in Wales took place at the Swansea Prison when Vivian Frederick Teed, a 24-year-old man, was hanged for the 1957 hammer murder of the manager of the branch post office of Fforestfach during a robbery.
- Died: Alfred M. Best, 81, American insurance industry executive who founded the A. M. Best service to evaluate and publish a rating of the financial stability of insurance companies.

== May 7, 1958 (Wednesday) ==
- Flying the recently introduced Lockheed F-104 Starfighter, U.S. Air Force Major Howard C. Johnson set a new record for highest altitude reached, making a "zoom climb" after taking off from Edwards Air Force Base in California and ascending to 91,249 feet (27,813 m) — more than 17 miles — breaking the previous record set five days earlier by a French Trident-06 of 80,190 feet (24,440 m) by more than 2 miles (3.2 km).

== May 8, 1958 (Thursday) ==
- A head-on collision between two trains killed 128 people in Brazil in the city of Mangueira, a suburb of Rio de Janeiro, and injured more than 300. A signalling error had routed an outgoing commuter train onto the same track as an incoming local train. The collision resulted in a 'horrible mass of twisted steel and mangled bodies' as the two trains telescoped together. Brazilian President Juscelino Kubitschek dismissed three officials of the Estrada de Ferro Central do Brasil for negligence.
- U.S. Vice President Richard M. Nixon was threatened by a hostile crowd of 2,000 leftist rioters while he was visiting Lima, the capital of Peru, as part of an official tour of South America. Nixon got out of his automobile to confront demonstrators who had massed outside of the University of San Marcos and "was spat upon, grazed on the neck by a stone, shoved and booed". A reporter at the scene wrote, "Pale with anger but keeping a tight smile on his lips, Mr. Nixon stood his ground for four minutes though engulfed by screaming demonstrators. He challenged them to face him in a debate."
- King Mohammed V of Morocco promulgated a royal charter to guide the North African nation to a constitutional monarchy, providing for an elected legislature and delegating more power to his cabinet of ministers. The King requested Ahmed Balafrej to form a new government as prime minister under the new system. Balafrej accepted and formed a cabinet five days later.
- The collapse of a wall, in a mine tunnel beneath the seabed near the Japanese city of Sasebo, drowned 29 coal miners.
- Lebanese journalist Nasib Al Matni, publisher of a Beirut newspaper, The Telegraph, was shot and killed in his office after his paper's continuous criticism of President Camille Chamoun. Matni's assassination outraged the Sunni Muslim and riots against the government of Chamoun (a Maronite Christian) broke out, beginning a civil war that would later be ended by U.S. intervention.
- U.S. Congressman Adam Clayton Powell Jr., whose district encompassed Harlem in New York City, was indicted by a federal grand jury on charges of income tax evasion.
- Horror of Dracula, released by Britain's Hammer Film Productions, was premiered with Christopher Lee making the first of nine appearances as the vampire from the Bram Stoker 1897 novel, and Peter Cushing in the first of five films as Count Dracula's nemesis, Dr. Van Helsing. Despite being produced in the United Kingdom, the film premiered in the United States before being premiered as Dracula two weeks later, on May 22 in London (the title had been altered in the U.S. to avoid conflict with the 1931 Universal Pictures film. The British version embellished Count Dracula with fangs, red contact lenses, and more blood.
- Died: Norman Bel Geddes, 65, American industrial designer and theatrical producer, died of a heart attack while having lunch with a friend at New York City's University Club.

== May 9, 1958 (Friday) ==
- Khan Abdul Jabbar Khan, chairman of the ruling Pakistan Republican Party and recently the Chief Minister of the province of West Pakistan, was assassinated while reading a newspaper outside his son's home in Lahore. An unemployed revenue clerk, Ata Mohammed, spoke with Khan (revered by his followers as "Dr. Khan Sahib") about help in getting back a lost job and, when the two men argued, the assassin brought out a long-bladed knife and plunged it into Khan's chest.
- Actor-singer Paul Robeson, whose passport had been reinstated, sang in a sold-out one-man recital at Carnegie Hall. The recital was such a success, that Robeson gave another one at Carnegie Hall a few days later; but, after this, Robeson would seldom be seen in public in the United States again. Recordings of his Carnegie Hall concerts would later be released on records and on compact discs.
- Vertigo, a psychological thriller produced and directed by Alfred Hitchcock and starring James Stewart and Kim Novak, premiered in San Francisco, where its filming had taken place. In 1989, Vertigo would be one of the first 25 films to be selected for preservation in the U.S. National Film Registry for being "culturally, historically, or aesthetically significant."
- Kala Pani, a Hindi Bollywood thriller directed by Raj Khosla and starring Dev Anand, Madhubala (Mumtaz Dehlavi) and Nalini Jaywant, premiered in India. addition to being one of the top 10 highest-grossing films of the year, it was a critical success with Anand and Jaywant winning the Best Actor and Best Actress Filmfare Awards, respectively.
- In Moscow, Mikhail Botvinnik regained the title of World Chess Champion that he had lost to Vasily Smyslov in a year earlier, when Smyslov offered to settle for a draw in the 23rd match of the 24-match series. Botvinnik led the series 12 points to 10 going into Game 23 (one point for a win and one-half point for a draw), and needed only a draw to win. The game was played entirely by telephone after the two Soviet chess players were denied permission to jointly stop, "regardless of physical condition". The final score was Botvinnik 12½, Smyslov 10½.
- Otto Brinkmann, the last of the 19 Nazi war criminals convicted in the Dora Trial and incarcerated, was released from Landsberg Prison. Brinkmann, operator of the Ellrich-Juliushütte concentration camp, had been one of seven sentenced to life imprisonment in 1947.
- Born: Tyrone Tootoosis, Canadian Cree actor and storyteller; in Maskwacis, Alberta (d. 2022)
- Died:
  - Admiral Koshirō Oikawa, 75, Japan's Minister of the Navy (1940-1941) and later the Chief of Staff of the Imperial Japanese Navy (1944-1945)
  - Joseph E. Davies, 81, former U.S. Ambassador to the Soviet Union (1936-1938)
  - Bill Goodwin, 47, American radio and TV actor and announcer, was found dead in his car after he had suffered a heart attack.

== May 10, 1958 (Saturday) ==
- In Egypt, Stephanos Sidarouss was elected by his fellow bishops of the Coptic Catholic Church to be the new Patriarch of Alexandria, Stephanos I, the leader of the church affiliated with Rome as one of the autonomous Eastern Catholic Churches. In 1965, Pope Paul VI would elevate Stephanos to the College of Cardinals in the Roman Catholic Church.
- The Communist nation of Albania created its own national officer training academy, the Akademia e Forcave të Armatosura (AFA), the Armed Forces Academy for the army, navy and air force.
- Born:
  - Ellen Ochoa, U.S. astronaut and the first Hispanic woman to go into outer space, later Director of the Johnson Space Center; in Los Angeles
  - Rick Santorum, U.S. Congressman and later U.S. Senator for Pennsylvania; in Winchester, Virginia
- Died: Richard Skelton, 9, son of popular U.S. television comedian Red Skelton, died of leukemia shortly before his 10th birthday. The child's illness was well publicized as The Red Skelton Show went on hiatus until Richard asked his father to return to the air, and raised public awareness of the blood cancer.

== May 11, 1958 (Sunday) ==
- Voting was held in Greece for the 300 seats of the Hellenic Parliament, which had been dissolved by King Paul after the March 2 resignation of Prime Minister Konstantinos Karamanlis. The National Radical Union (Ethniki Rizospastiki Enosis or ERE), led by Karmanalis, won a majority with 171 seats, and the United Democratic Left (Eniéa Dimokratikí Aristerá or EDA) of Ioannis Passalidis was a distant second with 79 seats. Karmanalis returned formed a new government and returned as prime minister.
- The Wexford Yellowbellies won the championship of Ireland's National Hurling League, earning the Liam MacCarthy Cup by defeating the Limerick Shannonsiders 5-7 to 4-8 (equivalent to 22 to 20 based on 3-point goals and 1-point for shots above the crossbar).
- Born: Christian Brando, American actor later imprisoned for homicide; to U.S. actor Marlon Brando and British actress Anna Kashfi in Los Angeles (d. of pneumonia, 2008)
- Died: Khosro Ruzbeh, 42, chief of military branch of the Communist Tudeh Party of Iran, was executed by firing squad at an army barracks at Tehran after torture and a secret trial.

== May 12, 1958 (Monday) ==
- A formal agreement establishing the North American Air Defense Command (NORAD) was signed between the United States and Canada. The next day, the governments of the U.S. and Canada agreed jointly to authorize their air defense forces "to retaliate without government consultation in the event of an enemy attack on the North American continent." The U.S. Strategic Air Command (SAC) was not part of the agreement, and President Eisenhower alone could make the decision to allow the SAC to use its nuclear weapons.
- Born: Dries van Noten, Belgian fashion designer; in Antwerp
- Died: Dr. Corydon M. Wassell, 73, U.S. Navy physician and World War II hero profiled in the 1944 Cecil B. DeMille film The Story of Dr. Wassell

== May 13, 1958 (Tuesday) ==
- A hostile crowd in Caracas, capital of Venezuela, carried out a violent attack meant to injure the Vice President of the United States, Richard Nixon, along with Venezuela's Foreign Minister Óscar García Velutini. Because of violence at an earlier visit to Peru, Vice President Nixon and his wife traveled in a closed-top car rather than in a convertible when the motorcade was slowed down by heavy traffic. While Caracas police stood by, the crowd cracked the bulletproof glass windows of the car with rocks and with their fists, and tried to overturn the car. Twelve U.S. Secret Service agents were traveling with Nixon and drew weapons, preparing to fire into the crowd, and Nixon ordered the agent-in-charge, Jack Sherwood, to hold fire unless Nixon gave the order to shoot. Nixon had earlier received intelligence briefing that indicated that he might be the target of an assassination attempt in Caracas.
- French Algerian protesters, organized by officers within the armed forces of France, seized government offices in Algiers in an attempt to prevent the North African colony from going from an overseas department (département d'outre-mer) to a republic under the rule of the majority Arab Algerian population (at the time, there were one million European residents and nine million Algerian Muslims). French Army Brigadier General Jacques Massu headed an 11-member junta made up of four French Army officers and seven European Algerian civilians, the Comité de salut public (Committee of Public Safety), to rule Algeria. At the same time, rebel officers and troops demanded that General Charles de Gaulle return to office as Prime Minister of France and to cease further action in turning Algeria over to the native Arab Algerians. At the same time, a mob of French nationalists, opposed to the loss of Algeria as three overseas départements of France, marched on the National Assembly but were halted by Paris gendarmes before they were able to reach the building. The uprising would lead to the downfall of the French government and the end of the French Fourth Republic system of government by October 4.
- In Lebanon, an armed insurrection against the government of President Camille Chamoun began, with rebels cutting off one of the major oil pipelines that supplied the Middle Eastern nation (and tankers bound for Western Europe) with petroleum from the Kirkuk oil field in Iraq.
- Ben Carlin of Canada became the first person to drive around the world, arriving back at Halifax, Nova Scotia, almost eight years after his departure in an amphibious jeep on July 19, 1950.
- Baseball player Stan Musial of the St. Louis Cardinals reached a major league mark held by only seven other people up to that time, getting his 3,000th major league hit that proved key to victory over the host Chicago Cubs. Originally, the plan was for "Stan the Man" to stay on the bench during the game so that he could reach the milestone before the hometown fans in St. Louis, but with the Cards down 3—1 after five innings, he was called up as a pinch hitter in the sixth inning and, with two strikes in his at-bat, hit a double to drive in one run, the first of a four-run rally that won the game.
- Born:
  - Juan Ángel Napout, Paraguayan sports administrator who served as president of the governing body of South American soccer football, CONMEBOL, for 16 months before being arrested on bribery charges; in Asunción
  - Nadeeka Gunasekara, Sri Lankan film and television actress; in Kandy, Ceylon (now Sri Lanka)

== May 14, 1958 (Wednesday) ==
- Pierre Pflimlin took office as Prime Minister of France after his nomination had been approved in the early hours of the morning by the National Assembly's 274 to 129 vote, the day after the outbreak of the rebellion by French Army officers in Algeria. Pfimlin would serve for only 18 days before being forced to resign in the wake of the crisis. At the same time, the new junta in French Algeria by dissident French Army officers found that it had been unable to stop the approval of Pfimlin or to win the support of General de Gaulle. General Massu, the junta chairman, acknowledged his disappointment at a news conference and said that he had no intention of setting up an insurrectionist government, and said that he had accepted leadership in order to placate the 40,000 persons who had seized government offices.
- The Christmas Island Act was given royal assent in Britain to enable the transfer of the Indian Ocean island from the jurisdiction of Singapore to that of Australia. The transfer would take place on October 1.
- U.S. Vice President Richard Nixon and his wife Pat Nixon cut short their tour of South America after being summoned home by U.S. President Eisenhower. The Nixons flew from Caracas, scene of the mob action of the vice president, and landed in U.S. territory in San Juan, Puerto Rico. A U.S. Navy aircraft carrier, a missiles cruiser, six destroyers and two companies of U.S. Marines had been sent to Venezuela to protect the Nixons and their entourage.
- The purchase of a new "Air Force One" was approved by President Eisenhower and for the first time, a jet airplane would be used to transport the U.S. President. A fleet of three Boeing 707 jets was bought to transport the president and other top U.S. government officials.
- Born: Rudy Pérez, Cuban-born American producer of Latin music; in Pinar del Río
- Died: Thomas L. Stokes, 59, American investigative journalist and Pulitzer Prize winner, from a brain tumor

== May 15, 1958 (Thursday) ==
- The Soviet Union launched Sputnik 3, at 2,925 pounds (1,327 kg) the heaviest object put into orbit up to that time. Referring to Vanguard 1, the 3.25 pounds (1.47 kg) satellite sent up by the U.S. in March, Soviet Premier Nikita Khrushchev said, "They will need very many satellites the size of oranges in order to catch up with the Soviet Union."
- A spokesman for the Comité de salut public, the junta led by French Army General Raoul Salan, the "military dictator of Algeria" since the overthrow of the colonial authority, said that the ruling Comité would be creating a governing council for all of the French Algerian territory from members from other parts of the area, which consisted of the three départements of Alger, Oran, and Constantine.
- French Army General Charles de Gaulle declared that he would be willing to assume leadership of France again if necessary.
- The crash of Pakistan International Airlines Flight 205 killed 21 of the 38 people on board. The Convair CV-240 took off from Delhi in India toward Karachi in Pakistan in dusty conditions, then descended back to the ground when the pilot was confused by the flight instruments and apparently had a "head up" illusion in which the perception of tilting too far upward is compensated by tilting the plane downward. Two people on the ground were killed as well.

== May 16, 1958 (Friday) ==
- France's National Assembly voted, 461 to 114, to declare a state of emergency in light of the threat of secession of French Algeria from Metropolitan France, and voted special powers to new Prime Minister Pierre Pflimlin. The upper house of parliament, the Council of the Republic approved the measure, 221 to 94.
- A Lockheed F-104 Starfighter, piloted by U.S. Air Force Captain Walter W. Irwin, set a world speed record of 1,404.19 mph (2,259.82 km/h). Departing from Edwards Air Force Base in California, Captain Irwin flew eastward for 5 miles (8.0 km) at 1,465.41 miles per hour (2,358.35 km/h), then returned to base at 1,342.97 miles per hour (2,161.30 km/h) at an altitude of 40,000 feet (12,000 m).
- U.S. Air Force Captain Eli Beeding sustained the highest g-force survived by a human being— 82.6 g— in an experiment with a rocket sled at the Holloman Air Force Base in New Mexico with deceleration from 35 miles per hour (56 km/h) to a complete stop in one-tenth of a second, equivalent to 82.6 times normal Earth gravity.
- Nicolas Grunitzky resigned as Prime Minister of French Togoland, at the time a French colony in Africa with limited self-government) following elections on April 27 that saw his Togolese Party of Progress lose 12 of its 15 seats, and was succeeded by Sylvanus Olympio, who would become the first president of the independent Republic of Togo in 1960. After Olympio's assassination in 1963, Grunitzky would become the second president.
- In a rare example of a death caused by a caged animal at a zoo, a child visiting the Washington Zoo with her grandfather was killed when she wandered through an opening in an outer barrier and got too close to a lion's cage. The 2½-year-old girl was pulled into the cage by a lion and, despite efforts by the grandfather to pull her back out, the lion was stronger.
- An experiment by a minor league baseball team, of placing a live microphone at home plate, was started by the Keokuk Cardinals (of Keokuk, Iowa), a member of the Midwest League. Broadcasting over the public address system at Joyce Park, and controlled from the press box, the sounds of conversation could be heard by the spectators. The first use was in the first game of a doubleheader, with Keokuk winning 1 to 0 over the visiting Waterloo Hawks. The "Talking Home Plate" was soon discontinued after team management found that it could also broadcast profanity and other foul language over the PA system.

== May 17, 1958 (Saturday) ==
- On orders of Chinese Communist Party Chairman Mao Zedong, the People's Republic of China adopted Project 581 to start the nation's own space program in three stages. China would put its first satellite into orbit on April 24, 1970.
- France moved closer to a civil war over the split of French Algeria from France as the Chief of Staff of the French Armed Forces, Paul Ély, resigned his office in protest of disciplinary measures over rebel officers, and a member of the National Assembly, former Governor-General of Algeria Jacques Soustelle, defected to French Algeria to assist in the uprising.
- A gasoline tank explosion in Paris killed 15 people and injured 28 more as it wrecked a seven-story building. The blast inside a garage was caused by a spark from an electric meter. Most of the victims were passers-by on Rue d'Oslo, and the dead included five schoolchildren who had been walking past the school on the way to lunch.
- The "Hearst Castle" in San Simeon, California, formerly the mansion of newspaper publisher William Randolph Hearst, was opened to the public as a California State Park, the Hearst San Simeon State Historical Monument. After Hearst's death in 1951, his heirs donated the 42-bedroom home to California but kept most of the surrounding lands.
- Tim Tam, winner of the Kentucky Derby, won the Preakness Stakes, capturing his second Triple Crown jewel of American thoroughbred horse racing.
- Born:
  - Paul Whitehouse, Welsh comedian known for Harry & Paul and The Fast Show; in Stanleytown, Rhondda Cynon Taf
  - Jeremy Coller, British investment expert who founded Coller Capital; in London

== May 18, 1958 (Sunday) ==
- The crash of a Sabena Airlines Douglas DC-7 killed 65 of the 69 people on board when the airliner crashed through an airport building while attempting to make an emergency landing in Casablanca in Morocco. The flight had originated in Brussels and most of the passengers were Belgians who had visited the 1958 World's Fair and were on their way back to their homes in the Belgian Congo (now the Democratic Republic of the Congo. After a stop in Lisbon, the flight was on its way to Léopoldville (now Kinshasa]) when it encountered engine trouble, then crashed at the airport. An alert passenger opened the passenger door and three others followed him out before the plane exploded.
- The involvement of the United States Central Intelligence Agency CIA in a covert action against the government of Indonesia was revealed when CIA pilot Allen Pope was captured alive after his B-26 bomber was shot down while he was attacking Indonesian Army transport ships. Pope would subsequently be found guilty of killing 17 Indonesian servicemen and six civilians, and sentenced to death, but the U.S. would negotiate his release in exchange for 10 C-130 Hercules military transport planes. Pope would be freed on July 2, 1962.
- Stade de Reims, champions of the regular season of France's premier soccer football league, Ligue 1, won the Coupe de France, 3 to 1, against second-place finisher Nîmes Olympique, before a crowd of 56,523 at the Stade Yves-du-Manoir in Colombes.
- Died:
  - Elmer Davis, 68, American journalist, radio show host and Peabody Award winner
  - Jacob Fichman, 76, Moldovan-born Israeli Hebrew poet

== May 19, 1958 (Monday) ==
- A cabinet of ministers composed of members from both Iraq and Jordan took office as the first ever for the new Arab Federation between the two kingdoms. King Faisal II of Iraq was the monarch of the Federation (with his cousin, King Hussein of Jordan as the Crown Prince). Nuri al-Said of Iraq was sworn in as the Premier, with Ibrahim Hashem of Jordan as the Deputy Premier. Iraqis were the ministers for the Treasury and Foreign Affairs, while a Jordanian was Minister of Defense. Ministers for domestic affairs remained separate for Iraq and Jordan.
- Died:
  - Ronald Colman, 67, British-American film actor and 1947 Academy Award winner
  - Archie Scott Brown, 31, Scottish Formula One and sports car racer who won the 1957 British Empire Trophy race despite disabilities including having only one hand, died from injures sustained the day before in a crash while competing at the Spa Grand Prix at the Francorchamps racetrack in Belgium. He was in the lead when his Lister Jaguar car skidded off the road, overturned and caught fire.

== May 20, 1958 (Tuesday) ==
- In Cuba, the government of Fulgencio Batista launched a counteroffensive against Castro's rebels.
- All 11 people aboard Capital Airlines Flight 300 were killed when the Vickers Viscount 745D was struck by a Maryland National Guard T-33 training jet at an altitude of 8,000 feet (2,400 m). Wreckage of the airliner fell onto a farm near Brunswick, Maryland. The plane, which had room for 48 passengers but was carrying only seven, was approaching Baltimore at the end of flight from Pittsburgh, where 27 of the people on board had departed after arriving from Chicago. The flight instructor was able to eject before the crash and parachuted to safety.
- Robert C. Baumann became the first person to receive a U.S. patent for the invention of a satellite. He had filed the application for creating the solar-powered Vanguard 1, the fourth orbiting satellite (after Sputnik 1, Sputnik 2 and Explorer 1) on August 1, 1957. The invention was awarded U.S. Patent 2,835,548.
- The National Advisory Committee for Aeronautics (NACA) and the U.S. Air Force signed a Memorandum of Understanding concerning principles in the development and testing of the Air Force's Hypersonic Boost Glide Vehicle (Dyna Soar I).
- Born: Ron Reagan, American liberal political commentator and radio talk-show host; in Los Angeles, to actress Nancy Davis and film and TV actor Ronald Reagan, the future First Lady and President of the United States.
- Died:
  - James Dole, 80, American entrepreneur known as "The Pineapple King" for developing the pineapple industry in the U.S. Territory of Hawaii prior to its statehood, and founded the Dole Food Company
  - Frédéric François-Marsal, 84, French politician who briefly served as the acting president and prime minister of France in 1924 after the resignation of Alexandre Millerand

== May 21, 1958 (Wednesday) ==
- Thirty-nine members of the Shan minority in Burma (now Myanmar), led by Saw Yanda and upset with the lack of negotiations to allow independence for the Shan State, formed an armed resistance movement, the Noom Seik Harn, to fight the national government. The group and its followers would split up in 1960.
- Postmaster General Ernest Marples announced that in December, subscriber trunk dialling (which permitted users to do direct dialing of a telephone number without having to go through a switchboard operator), would be introduced in the UK, starting in the Bristol area. Queen Elizabeth II would make the first phone call (from Bristol to Edinburgh on December 5, 1958.
- Born:
  - Naeem Khan, Indian-born American fashion designer; in Bombay (now Mumbai)
  - Christian Audigier, French fashion designer; in Avignon (d. 2015)

== May 22, 1958 (Thursday) ==
- Elections were held in Japan for the 467 seats of the Shūgiin, the nation's House of Representatives. Despite losing 10 seats, the Liberal Democratic Party (LDP), led by Prime Minister Nobusuke Kishi, retained its majority, winning 267 races, and the Japan Socialist Party (JSP) was second, with 166.
- Six U.S. Army soldiers and four civilian ordnance experts were killed in the accidental explosion of eight Nike Ajax guided missiles at the base of the U.S. Army's 526th Missile Battalion in Middletown, New Jersey.
- French pediatrician and geneticist Jerome Lejeune and researcher Marthe Gautier made the discovery that Down syndrome was caused by a 47th chromosome rather than the 46 (in 23 pairs) in most people. The 47th would later be found to be a third copy of chromosome 21.
- Dwight D. Eisenhower became the first U.S. President to appear on color television, appearing on the Washington, D.C., television station at the dedication ceremonies for the new NBC's affiliate, WRC-TV Channel 4 as the first to be designed to broadcast in color. Robert Sarnoff, president of NBC at the time, in the middle of the black-and-white television taping, pushed a button to convert the tape to color and then introduced President Eisenhower. The tape was broadcast later in the day.
- India's President, Rajendra Prasad, issued a decree, the Armed Forces (Special Powers) Ordinance, to send troops to take over the Indian states of Assam and Manipur, both in Northeast India, the section separated from the rest of the nation by West Pakistan (now Bangladesh). The ordinance would be superseded by the national parliament on September 11 with passage of the Armed Forces (Special Powers) Act (AFSPA), eventually applying to the "Seven Sister States" in the region.
- Died: Richmond Palmer, 81, British colonial governor of the Gambia (1930-1934) and of Cyprus (1933-1938)

== May 23, 1958 (Friday) ==
- The first U.S. satellite, Explorer 1 ceased transmission as the batteries on the second of the two transmitters stopped working at 10:30 in the morning Eastern time. Explorer had been launched on January 30 and circled the Earth every 115 minutes, or 25 times every two days. It would continue to orbit almost 12 more years after its batteries died, falling out of orbit on March 31, 1970 after 58,400 orbits.
- Four days after the collision between a U.S. Air Force training aircraft and the passenger airliner that killed everyone on Capital Airlines Flight 300, U.S. President Eisenhower issued an immediate order for a five-point safety program to ban non-tactical military flights below 20,000 feet (6,100 m) in a designated federal airway, including failure to use instruments. The new rules went into effect after midnight the next day.
- Alexey Dobrovolsky and several other members of the neo-Nazi Russian National Socialist Party (RNSP) were arrested after distributing leaflets "with anti-Soviet and anti-communist slogans" as well as advocating the overthrow of the Soviet government. After conviction, Dobrovolsky and his fellow RNSP members were sentenced to three years in prison camps. After his release in 1961, he would join another right-wing dissident group and be re-arrested in 1964 and sent for a year to a government psychiatric hospital for "delusions of reformism".
- Al Ahly Sporting Club of Egypt won its eighth consecutive Egyptian Premier League title in soccer football, under a new system that divided the 16-team league in to two 8-team divisions and then had the first place finisher in each division face each other in a two game playoff. After a 1-1 draw against Zamalek SC, the perennial second place finisher, Al Ahly defeated Zamalek 3-1 in the second match, for an aggregate score of 4 to 2. Both teams were based in Cairo.
- Born:
  - Drew Carey, American comedian and later game show host; in Cleveland, Ohio
  - Mitch Albom, American sports columnist and author of multiple inspirational books, including the nonfiction Tuesdays with Morrie and the novel The Five People You Meet in Heaven; in Passaic, New Jersey
  - Lea DeLaria, American comedian and actress, known for being the first openly lesbian comic on television; in Belleville, Illinois

== May 24, 1958 (Saturday) ==
- The United Press International (UPI) news agency was formed by the merger of United Press (UP), created in 1907 by E. W. Scripps, and the International News Service (INS), formed in 1909 by William Randolph Hearst. The first UPI dispatch was the announcement of the union, agreed upon on May 16, of the two news agencies as a larger competitor to the Associated Press.
- Following the lead of the anti-government rebellion in French Algeria, dissident soldiers seized control of the government of Corsica, a Mediterranean island of Corsica, cut off all telephone communications to the French mainland, and installed a 12-man Committee of Public Safety that pledged its support to General De Gaulle.
- An accident at Canada's National Research Universal reactor (NRU) at the Chalk River Laboratories site at Deep River, Ontario, released radioactive combustion products inside the building housing the reactor, after a damaged uranium fuel rod caught fire and was torn in two as it was being removed from the core. One of the staff assigned to cleanup would later become permanently disabled from multiple skin cancers.
- Rebels in Indonesia, losing in their battle against the government of President Sukarno and having abandoned West Sumatra and the city of Padang as the rebel capital, announced a new government in the North Sulawesi province with a capital at Manado and former Indonesian Army Colonel Joop Warouw as the acting Premier.
- The Dutch airline Martinair was founded by Martin Schröder and John Block, in Amsterdam. Starting with a single charter aircraft, a de Havilland Dove that could carry 11 passengers, the airline operated initially as Martin's Air Charter (MAC).
- The consecutive games streak of first baseman Tokuji Iida, of the (Osaka) Nankai Hawks and the (Tokyo) Kokutestu Swallows of Japan professional baseball leagues ended at 1,246.
- The Third Asian Games opened in Tokyo with 1,820 athletes from 20 nations, to run until June 1.
- Died: Fazıl Önder, 31, Turkish Cypriot journalist who advocated independence from the UK for Cyprus as a union of Turkish and Greek Cypriots, was assassinated by the Turkish Resistance Organisation.

== May 25, 1958 (Sunday) ==
- The first of two days of voting was held in Italy for all 596 seats of the Camera dei deputati and for the 246-seat Senato della Repubblica. The Democrazia Cristiana (DC) party won a plurality of seats (273), just 22 short of a majority and Amintore Fanfani would form a coalition government in July, succeeding fellow DC member Adone Zoli. The DC gained 10 seats in the Senate to have exactly half (123) of those available.
- Under emergency rule regulations authorized in response to the military rebellion in France, the government of Prime Minister Pflimlin imposed censorship on all newspapers and broadcasters dispensing information within French borders.
- University of Paris professor Jean Gottman made the first description of the string of Atlantic coast cities from Boston to Washington, D.C., as a large contiguous metropolitan area, a concept later referred to by futurist Herman Kahn as "BosWash". Gottman's concept, published in the annual report of the Twentieth Century Fund, was dubbed by Gottman as "Megalopolis".
- Born: Dorothy Straight, American author who became, at age six in 1964, the youngest published book writer up to that time when Pantheon Books published How the World Began; in Washington, D.C.
- Died:
  - William K. Hutchinson, 61, American journalist for the International News Service (INS), died the day after the announcement that INS had merged with the United Press to become UPI.
  - Steinn Steinarr (pen name for Athalsteinn Kristmundsson), 49, Icelandic poet

== May 26, 1958 (Monday) ==
- Located in the U.S. in Shippingport, Pennsylvania, the Shippingport Atomic Power Station, the first atomic electric power plant devoted exclusively to peacetime use, was dedicated by U.S. President Eisenhower, although the reactor had been operational since December 18. The President remained at the White House and spoke to the assembled crowd by telephone and at the end of his brief speech, "the President waved a neutron wand above a neutron counter to start by remote control an electric motor," which "opened the main turbine throttle valve, raising power production to 60,000 kilowatts" in Shippingport. Eisenhower had used the "neutron wand" (which generated mild radioactivity to test a Geiger counter) to remotely activate an unmanned power shovel for the groundbreaking ceremony on September 6, 1954. The reactor would operate until October 1, 1982, and the plant decommissioned in 1989.
- The new government of the island of Corsica, which had overthrown the French-appointed territorial administration and replaced it with a military junta, came under the administration of the military government of French Algeria. General Raoul Salan, the French leader of the new Algerian government, appointed another French Army officer, Colonel Robert Thomazo, as the new military governor of Corsica.
- Soviet soccer football player Eduard "Edik" Streltsov, a forward for FC Torpedo Moscow and one of the stars of the Soviet national team, was arrested shortly before he was to appear in the 1958 World Cup, along with his comrades on the national team, Mikhail Ogonkov and Boris Tatushin of FC Spartak Moscow. All three were charged with rape on questionable evidence, and Streltsov would be convicted and sentenced to 12 years in one of the Gulag forced labor camps. Released on February 4, 1963, after nearly five years incarceration, Streltsov would be allowed to return to professional soccer football in 1965 and again become a star.
- The first Czechoslovakian Wolfdogs, a hybrid of a wolf and a dog, were born at a military base in Libějovice (now in the Czech Republic) from a Carpathian grey wolf named "Brita" after breeding with a German Shepherd named "Cézar". The breed would eventually be recognized by the Fédération Cynologique Internationale (FCI or International Canine Federation) in 1989.
- Born: Margaret Colin, American TV actress known for As the World Turns and Gossip Girl; in Brooklyn
- Died:
  - Constantin "Bazu" Cantacuzino, 52, Romania's greatest flying ace during World War II, with 43 confirmed shootdowns; he had previously been captain of the world champion Romanian ice hockey team
  - Cheong Yoke Choy, 84, Chinese-born Malayan philanthropist

== May 27, 1958 (Tuesday) ==
- The F-4 Phantom fighter jet, created by McDonnell Aircraft Corporation made its first flight, with test pilot Robert C. Little as its first pilot.
- France's Prime Minister Pierre Pflimlin and his government won a vote of confidence for proposed constitutional reforms, 408 to 165 in the French National Assembly, despite being opposed by an increasing number of military officers who wanted Charles de Gaulle to return to power. Despite the victory, Pflimlin tendered his resignation early the next morning.
- U.S. President Eisenhower signed into law a rule raising the price of a stamp by 33 percent, from 3 cents to 4 cents, effective August 1. Eisenhower had sought to raise the postage rate for letter going out of town by two-thirds, from 3 cents to five cents.
- Ernest Green, one of the nine African-Americans who integrated Central High School in Little Rock, Arkansas, became the first-ever black graduate of the formerly all-white school.
- Born:
  - Wayne Bertram Williams, American serial killer suspected as the perpetrator of the Atlanta Child Murders between 1979 and his capture in 1981; in Atlanta
  - Linnea Quigley, American actress known for her appearances in multiple horror films; in Davenport, Iowa
- Died:
  - Cardinal Samuel Stritch, 70, former Roman Catholic Archbishop of Chicago, died in Rome a month after having arrived on April 26 to become the new Prefect of the Sacred Congregation for the Propagation of the Faith. Hours after arriving to begin his new job, Stritch suffered a thrombosis in his right arm, and had his arm amputated two days later. and suffered a stroke on May 19 while still hospitalized.
  - Lionel Shapiro, 50, Canadian journalist and novelist known for his romantic novel The Sixth of June which was adapted to a popular film.

== May 28, 1958 (Wednesday) ==
- The four-day Battle of Bab El Bekkouche between 8,000 French Army troops and an unknown number of Algerian National Liberation Front (NLF) guerrillas began as the FLN attacked the French outpost at Lardjem in the Ouarsenis mountains. By the end of the battle on May 31, the French Army suffered 600 deaths, including 33 officers, while 360 of the Algerian forces and 240 civilians were killed.
- At Heysel Stadium in Brussels, Real Madrid, champions of Spain's La Liga, defeated A.C. Milan (defending champions of Italy's Serie A, 3–2, to win soccer football's European Cup in extra time.
- Three days after celebrating the centennial of its 1858 founding, the United Presbyterian Church of North America merged with the Presbyterian Church in the United States of America to form the largest Presbyterian Christian church up to that time, the United Presbyterian Church in the United States of America. The union of two of the largest denominations within the church took place in the city of Pittsburgh and the new denomination "came into being at 9:58 A. M. when the moderators of the two merging denominations clasped hands in a minor cloud burst at the intersection of Fifth Avenue and Bigelow Boulevard."
- The U.S. House of Representatives voted for the second time in eight years to admit Alaska as the 49th state of the United States, with the measure passing, 208 to 166. In the 1954 vote, the House had approved Alaska's admission, but the measure was blocked from reaching a vote in the U.S. Senate.
- Born: Bert Koenders, Netherlands Minister of Foreign Affairs from 2014 to 2017, and President of the NATO Parliamentary Assembly 2006 to 2007; in Arnhem

== May 29, 1958 (Thursday) ==
- The U.S. Navy submarine USS Stickleback sank in the Pacific Ocean five and one half hours after it had collided with the destroyer USS Silverstein, about 19 miles (31 km) from Pearl Harbor in Hawaii. The entire 82-man crew, led by Lieutenant Commander Quinley R. Shulz, was rescued from the submarine before the vessel sank 10,800 feet (3,300 m) to the bottom of the sea. Shulz for sounded the general quarters command and warning 30 seconds before the collision and to the crew for responding quickly to prevent the torpedo room from flooding, which would have resulted in the sub sinking quickly. Pumping continued long enough to keep the vessel afloat for everyone on board to escape before the sub finally went down.
- French Army General Charles de Gaulle accepted an invitation from President René Coty to come out of retirement to become Prime Minister of France, on the condition that the new government would be given full power to reform the nation's constitution. De Gaulle's return to power had been sought by mutineering officers who had overthrown the government of French Algeria, and by members of the French National Assembly who were wanting to bring an end to the threat of civil war in France. "De Gaulle Accepts Call to Form Cabinet if It Receives 'Full Powers' for Reforms", The New York Times, May 30, 1958, p. 1
- Peter Anthony Manuel, an American-born resident of Scotland, was found guilty of seven counts of murder by a jury in Glasgow and sentenced to death by hanging. Manuel, dubbed "The Beast of Birkenshaw" by the media, had been arrested on January 14. He would be hanged at Barlinnie Prison on July 11.
- The Changbai Korean Autonomous County was created within the Jilin province by the State Council of the People's Republic of China.
- In the middle of testifying before a hearing at the U.S. House of Representatives Interior Subcommittee, electric power executive Frank M. Wilkes collapsed and died at the U.S. Capitol. Speaking in opposition to a proposed bill, Wilkes, 68, "was reading from a statement when his voice choked and he slumped over the witness table," according to a UPI report. Dr. Arthur L. Miller, a U.S. Representative from Nebraska, rushed to render aid to Wilkes, who died 30 seconds after Miller reached the table. Wilkes was the second witness to die in less than a month; labor union official Sidney Lewis had died of a heart attack moments before he was set to testify before the U.S. Senate Select Committee on Improper Activities.
- Born:
  - Annette Bening, American stage, film and TV actress; in Topeka, Kansas
  - Mark Solonin, Russian aviation engineer and historian; in Kuybyshev, Russian SFSR, Soviet Union
- Died: Juan Ramón Jiménez, 76, Spanish poet and 1956 winner of the Nobel Prize in Literature

== May 30, 1958 (Friday) ==
- The bodies of two unidentified United States soldiers, one killed in action during World War II and one killed in action in the Korean War, were buried at the Tomb of the Unknowns, in Arlington National Cemetery.
- On the first lap of the annual Indianapolis 500 race, a chain reaction pileup of 13 race cars killed driver Pat O'Connor, a favorite of the crowd. Only 13 drivers out of the starting field of 33 were on the track by race's end, first of whom was winner Jimmy Bryan.
- The Douglas DC-8 narrow body airliner, designed to compete with the Boeing 707, made its first test flight.
- The late Béla Bartók's Violin Concerto No. 1 was given its first performance, 50 years after he had written it, premiering in Basel in Switzerland. Mason, Colin (1958).
- Born:
  - Michael López-Alegría, Spanish-born U.S. astronaut known for three Space Shuttle missions launched from the U.S., one mission to the International Space Station launched from Russia, and for Axiom-1, the first all-private space tourist mission; in Madrid
  - Swedish singer Marie Fredriksson, best known as a member of the pop duo Roxette.
- Died:
  - British Army Major Jocelyn Lee Hardy, 63, military officer known for his courage on the battlefield and multiple escapes from German POW camps
  - Maximilian Pilzer, 68, American symphony conductor, died of a concussion of the brain after collapsing during a concert in front of an audience of thousands. According to The New York Times "Mr. Pilzer was conducting Johann Strauss's gay overture to Die Fledermaus when he fell backward. His head struck the edge of the stage, where there is a strip of concrete." Attempts to revive him were unsuccessful, and Pilzer was pronounced dead on arrival at a nearby hospital.

== May 31, 1958 (Saturday) ==
- President Coty formally appointed Charles de Gaulle as the new Premier of France after negotiations between de Gaulle and the leaders of several political parties at de Gaulle's headquarters at the Hotel la Perouse in Paris. De Gaulle then proceeded to the president's offices at the Élysée Palace for the widely-anticipated meeting with Coty, and de Gaulle and Coty then made the announcement to reporters at 7:10 in the evening. France's Socialist Party was split on the issue of supporting de Gaulle, with 44 of the 95 Socialist deputies agreeing to vote with other pro-de Gaulle legislators.
- Portugal's Council of State permitted General Humberto Delgado, an opponent of Prime Minister António de Oliveira Salazar, to run for President of Portugal, despite Salazar's domination of the Council by autocratic rule and Delgado's own statement about Salazar (in a May 10 interview) that if elected president on June 8, "Obviously, I'll fire him!" The Council accepted the candidacy of Salazar's choice for president, Américo Tomás, who would win the controversial election.
- The first Pizza Hut restaurant opened, as brothers Dan and Frank Carney began operating at a location in Wichita, Kansas, at 503 South Bluff Street. Within a year, they had six restaurants, and more than 60 years later, almost 19,000 worldwide.
- Public buses in the Louisiana metropolis of New Orleans were fully integrated for the first time in the city's history, after an order from U.S. District Judge J. Skelly Wright eliminating the practice of requiring African-Americans to sit at the back of the bus, separate from white passengers sitting in the front.
- Died: Mary Welch, 35, American stage actress and wife of actor David White, died of complications of pregnancy. Welch had taken leave from performing the role of Marguerite LeHand on Broadway in the Tony Award-winning play Sunrise at Campobello.
