= 1955 Governor General's Awards =

Canadian literary award

In Canada, the 1955 Governor General's Awards for Literary Merit were the nineteenth such awards. The awards in this period had no monetary prize but were an honour for the authors.

== Winners ==
- Fiction: Lionel Shapiro, The Sixth of June (filmed as D-Day the Sixth of June).
- Poetry or Drama: Wilfred Watson, Friday's Child.
- Non-Fiction: N.J. Berrill, Man's Emerging Mind.
- Non-Fiction: Donald G. Creighton, John A. Macdonald, The Old Chieftain.
- Juvenile: Kerry Wood, The Map-Maker.
