= The Sixth of June =

1955 novel by Lionel Shapiro

- Author: Lionel Shapiro
- Language: English
- Publisher: Doubleday & Company, Inc.
- Publication date: 1955
- Publication place: Canada
- Pages: 311

The Sixth of June is a 1955 novel by Lionel Shapiro. The book won the Canadian 1955 Governor General's Award for fiction. The description of England during wartime and the battle scenes are rendered more authentic by the author's own personal experience as a war correspondent who landed with the Canadian forces on D-Day. The book was adapted for film in a 1956 Hollywood movie called D-Day the Sixth of June.

== Synopsis ==
Brad Parker, an American soldier, travels to England as part of the country's war effort. Despite being married, he falls deeply in love with an English woman. The woman, Valerie, is already engaged to an English soldier, John Wynter, who is heavily involved in the war effort but is away fighting in Italy. A romantic entanglement ensues which reaches a climax of all involved in Operation Overlord, better known as D-Day.

== Reception ==
Globe and Mail reviewer, A.G. Deacon wrote that the book was a realistic depiction of wartime England. Deacon said that the book was in no way a sentimental book. No villains are present and he said, "the book's undoubted popularity will probably rest on the fact that the reader will admire and sympathize with so many contrasting individuals, each real and wholesome."

The book was well received and was featured in the Book-of-the-Month-Club. Initial sales of the book were well over 600,000 in Canada and the United States. The movie rights of the book were quickly picked which resulted in a movie that came out in 1956, entitled D-Day the Sixth of June. Shapiro is estimated to have made $200,000 from the sale of the books and the movie rights.

The book won the Governor General's Award for fiction in 1955.
