= Larisa Kislinskaya =

Russian journalist (1958–2022)

- Born: Larisa Yurievna Kislinskaya; 8 June 1958; Moscow, Russian SFSR, Soviet Union
- Died: c. 13 February 2022 (aged 63); Moscow, Russia
- Resting place: Khovanskoye Cemetery
- Education: MSU Faculty of Journalism
- Occupation: Journalist

Larisa Yurievna Kislinskaya (Russian: Лари́са Ю́рьевна Кисли́нская; 8 June 1958 – c. 13 February 2022) was a Russian journalist and columnist.

== Life and career ==
Larisa Yurievna Kislinskaya was born in Moscow, USSR on 8 June 1958. In 1980 she graduated from the Faculty of Journalism of Moscow State University.

While still a student under a contract, she worked as a columnist in the newspaper Trud. Since 1980, Larisa was a special correspondent and editor of the culture department, since 1986 – a columnist for the news service of the TASS news agency. She also worked as a columnist for the newspaper Sovetskaya Rossiya.

Since June 1997, she worked as a columnist and member of the editorial board in the Top Secret newspaper. The first investigations of the journalist in Top Secret told about the "bath adventures" of the former Minister of Justice of the Russian Federation, Valentin Kovalyov.

In 1997–1998, along with Kirill Belyaninov (Novye Izvestia), Sergei Sokolov and Sergei Pluzhnikov (Literaturnaya Gazeta) and three other employees, she was part of a special investigation group of the Top Secret holding, being its informal leader.

For more than five years, she collaborated with the Moscow branch of the Center for the Study of Transnational Crime and Corruption at the American University.

== Death ==
After Kislinskaya had stopped communicating with her acquaintances, one of her friends visited her apartment. Kislinskaya was found dead, at the age of 63.

== Awards ==
In 1987, for a series of articles on organized crime, she received an award from the Union of Journalists of Moscow. In 2000, she became a laureate of the "Best feathers of Russia" award. At the same time, the Popular Press Association named her the most famous crime journalist in Russia.
