= United Nations Security Council Resolution 128 =

UN Security Council Resolution 128
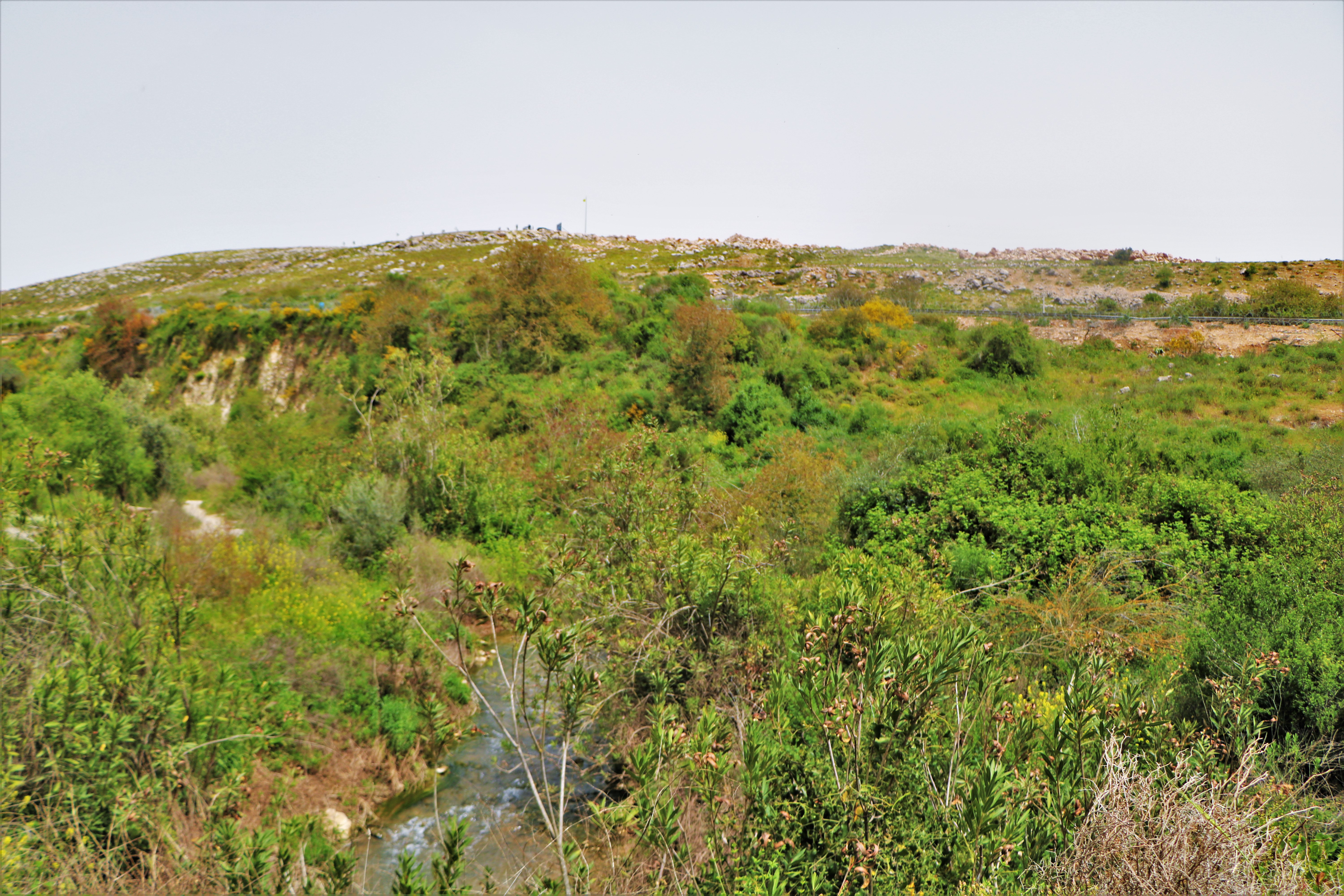
- Lebanese border
- Date: June 11 1958
- Meeting no.: 825
- Code: S/4023 (Document)
- Subject: Complaint by Lebanon
- Voting summary: 10 voted for; None voted against; 1 abstained
- Result: Adopted

Security Council composition
- Permanent members: China; France; Soviet Union; United Kingdom; United States
- Non-permanent members: Canada; Colombia; Iraq; Japan; Panama; Sweden

United Nations Security Council Resolution 128 was adopted on June 11, 1958. Having heard charges from the representative of Lebanon concerning interference by the United Arab Republic in the internal affairs of Lebanon, the Council decided to dispatch an observation group, designated the United Nations Observation Group in Lebanon, to ensure that no illegal infiltration of personnel, supply of arms or other materiel across the Lebanese borders was taking place. The Council authorized the Secretary-General to take the necessary steps to that end and requested the observation group keep them informed through the Secretary-General.

Resolution 128 was adopted by ten votes to none, with an abstention from the Soviet Union.

== See also ==
- List of United Nations Security Council Resolutions 101 to 200 (1953–1965)
