= United Nations Observation Group in Lebanon =

- Abbreviation: UNOGIL
- Formation: 11 June 1958
- Type: Peacekeeping Mission
- Legal status: Concluded
- Headquarters: Beirut
- Parent organization: UN Security Council
- Budget: $US3.7 million
- Website: peacekeeping.un.org/sites/default/files/past/unogil.htm

The United Nations Observation Group in Lebanon (UNOGIL) was established by United Nations through Security Council Resolution 128 on 11 June 1958 in response to the 1958 Lebanon crisis. The group was deployed between June and December 1958 in an observation and reporting capacity only, providing assurance that no weapons or personnel were infiltrating into Lebanon from Syria.

== Mandate and tasks ==
The group was established following the passing of Security Council Resolution 128 on 11 June 1958 in response to the 1958 Lebanon crisis, which had been triggered by an armed rebellion against the Camille Chamoun's government in May. UNOGIL was tasked with ensuring there was "no illegal infiltration of personnel or supply of arms or other materiel across Lebanese borders" following concerns from the Lebanese government about the involvement of the United Arab Republic, who they believed were, according to authors Ana Mesquita and Nigel White, "supporting the infiltration of armed elements from Syria into Lebanon" during the 1958 Lebanon crisis. In order to obtain Security Council consent amidst Cold War geopolitics, the group's mandate was deliberately narrow, limited to observation and reporting only, and it was given no authority to enforce this mandate, nor was it equipped to do so.

== Deployment ==
The force was deployed very quickly after approval, drawing on assets already deployed to other peacekeeping missions in the region, with the first observers arriving in Lebanon on 12 June. The advanced party began reconnaissance the following day, and the first official meeting of the group's governing committee taking place in Beirut on 19 June. However, for the first month its ability to fulfil its mandate was constrained by lack of access to all sites; while the Lebanese government had granted this access, UNOGIL was unable to access sites occupied by opposition forces until mid-July. At this time, freedom of movement and patrol was provided and plans for the establishment of permanent observation posts were set in place. Following this, the group began expanding its areas of operation and more personnel were sent as UNOGIL was expanded. Over the following months, the observers were able to determine that only a small amount of arms had been brought through the border areas and that the movement of personnel for military purposes was largely non-existent.

The group operated along the Lebanon-Syrian border and initially it was provided with two helicopters and four light aircraft to assist with aerial patrols. These were augmented by vehicle patrols and observation posts on the ground. By November, when the force reached its full strength, it had a total of 290 vehicles, 18 aircraft and six helicopters. A total of 49 ground posts had been established. Personnel were unarmed, although throughout the deployment, the United States unsuccessfully requested that this be reversed.

== Personnel ==
Shortly after its establishment, UNOGIL consisted of 113 personnel, although this was steadily expanded in the months that followed. At its height in November 1958, the group's strength numbered 591 military personnel with a number of civilian support staff. The mission's headquarters was in Beirut; its budget was US$3.7 million, which was funded through the annual UN vote.

Military personnel were drawn from 21 countries: Afghanistan, Argentina, Burma, Canada, Ceylon, Chile, Denmark, Ecuador, Finland, India, Indonesia, Ireland, Italy, Nepal, Netherlands, New Zealand, Norway, Peru, Portugal, Sweden and Thailand. Initial personnel were drawn from the United Nations Truce Supervision Organization and equipment was obtained from the United Nations Emergency Force. The senior military officer assigned to the mission was Major General Odd Bull, a Norwegian officer, who held the position of executive officer. An Ecuadorian, Galo Plaza Lasso was chairman; Rajeshwar Dayal from India also served as a member of committee established to oversee the group.

== Withdrawal ==
Despite the progress that UNOGIL made in the latter half of 1958, the success of the mission was impacted by wider strategic and political events, specifically the deployment of United States Marines following revolution in Iraq, which challenged the group's impartiality and undermined the local population's confidence in UNOGIL in opposition-occupied areas. Events in Jordan, and the political backdrop of the Cold War, also impacted the ongoing viability of the mission and gave impetus for the withdrawal of foreign troops from Lebanon. In early November, diplomatic relations between Lebanon and the United Arab Republic improved and the Lebanese government officially asked the UN to withdraw its earlier concerns.

Accordingly, plans were made to withdraw the force on 21 November as it was assessed that the situation in Lebanon had eased and the mission's mandate had been achieved. This process was completed on 9 December 1958, by which time the group had been reduced to 375 personnel. There were no fatalities recorded amongst the deployed personnel. In assessing the operation, Mesquita and White state that due to its narrow mandate, it is "debatable whether UNOGIL directly contributed to stabilizing the political and security situation in Lebanon"; however, they argue that UNOGIL's presence and reports did ultimately help to reduce tensions and constrain violence in the area. They also highlight the short time in which the operation was stood up, arguing that it demonstrated an example of "flexibility and inventiveness".
