= D-Day the Sixth of June =

1956 romantic war film directed by Henry Koster

- Original film poster by Jock Hinchliffe
- Directed by: Henry Koster
- Screenplay by: Harry Brown; Ivan Moffat
- Based on: The Sixth of June; 1955 novel by Lionel Shapiro
- Produced by: Charles Brackett
- Starring: Robert Taylor; Richard Todd; Dana Wynter; Edmond O'Brien
- Cinematography: Lee Garmes
- Edited by: William Mace
- Music by: Lyn Murray
- Production company: 20th Century Fox
- Distributed by: 20th Century Fox
- Release date: May 29, 1956
- Running time: 106 minutes
- Country: United States
- Language: English
- Budget: $2,075,000
- Box office: $1.95 million (US rentals)

D-Day the Sixth of June is a 1956 American DeLuxe Color CinemaScope romance war film made by 20th Century Fox. It was directed by Henry Koster and produced by Charles Brackett from a screenplay by Ivan Moffat and Harry Brown, based on the 1955 novel, The Sixth of June by Lionel Shapiro. The film stars Robert Taylor, Richard Todd (who participated in the Normandy landings in real life), Dana Wynter, and Edmond O'Brien.

== Plot ==
A few hours before D-Day, Special Force Six, a joint American-British-Canadian commando unit, embarks to destroy an especially well-defended German coastal gun emplacement on the Normandy coast. As the landing ship steams towards it, its commander, an Englishman, and one of his subordinates, an American, reflect on their love for the same woman.

Captain Brad Parker, an American paratrooper invalided out because of a broken leg suffered during a parachute jump, is posted to the headquarters of the European Theatre of Operations in London. He is sent on an errand by his new commanding officer Colonel Alexander Timmer. During this he encounters brigadier Russell who has been wounded during the Dunkirk evacuation. Russell is raising a complaint about the slovenly attitude of the US soldiers around his local village. As Parker leaves he meets Russell's daughter Valerie who is already engaged to a British officer Lieutenant Colonel John Wynter of the British Commandos. Valerie tries to explain her father's attitude and Parker becomes charmed by her.

John has been posted overseas, while Brad is working in London. While staying in London Brad meets Valerie and over time the two become lovers. Brad is eventually posted overseas and manages to get back to London by volunteering to join what becomes Special Force Six, led by Colonel Timmer. With only a few hours before the operation is due to embark, Timmer goes to pieces (partly as a result of his earlier bad experiences in the failed Dieppe Raid) and is arrested whilst drunk and breaking security (this incident is clearly based on a similar breach of security by Major General Henry J. F. Miller). Wynter, now a colonel, who has recovered from being badly wounded, is brought in to command the operation.

The operation is a success, despite several killed and wounded. Parker is badly wounded and evacuated. Wynter is wounded as well, and while he is awaiting evacuation, is killed when he steps on a mine.

In the hospital, and due to be repatriated, Parker sees Valerie for the last time. She does not tell him that Wynter has been killed, and, after a final embrace with Parker, Valerie leaves the hospital with her head hung in despondent loneliness.

== Cast ==
- Robert Taylor as Captain Brad Parker
- Richard Todd as Lieutenant Colonel John Wynter
- Dana Wynter as Valerie Russell
- Edmond O'Brien as Lieutenant Colonel/Colonel Alexander Timmer
- John Williams as Brigadier Russell
- Jerry Paris as Raymond Boyce
- Robert Gist as Major Dan Stenick
- Richard Stapley as David Archer
- Ross Elliott as Major Mills
- Alex Finlayson as Colonel Doug Harkens

== Production ==
Lionel Shapiro (1908–1958) was a Canadian war correspondent for The Montreal Gazette who landed at the Allied invasion of Sicily, Salerno and Juno Beach on D-Day with the Canadian forces. His 1955 romantic novel The Sixth of June was awarded the Governor General's Award for English-language fiction. As opposed to a historical account such as The Longest Day, The Sixth of June is a love triangle of adulterous relationships set in war such as The Man in the Gray Flannel Suit that was also filmed by 20th Century Fox in 1956. Robert Taylor echoes his appearance in Waterloo Bridge by wearing a trenchcoat and romancing English lady Dana Wynter. Wynter called it her favorite of all her films, being an unresolved love story.

Though originally planned to be filmed in Britain with Jean Simmons as the female lead, The Sixth of June (the working title of the film) was made on the Fox backlot with naval scenes filmed at the Long Beach Naval Shipyard, featuring the hospital ship USS Haven (AH-12), whilst the beach landing was made at Point Dume California. Before the days of computer-generated imagery director Henry Koster had to make his landing look convincing on his limited budget with two LCVPs and eighty soldiers. In the invasion scene soldiers running out of the two landing craft appear in front of a back projection scene of another take of the same scene giving the appearance of twice as many landing craft and soldiers as there actually were.

Unlike many American war films D-Day the Sixth of June presents the viewpoints of British characters and features Canadian troops in action. The film's microcosm version of the Normandy landings is a Pointe du Hoc type assault featuring an imaginary "Special Force Six" made up of British, American and Canadian troops in equal quantities. When Taylor's character is wounded it is Todd and the British and Canadians who destroy the big gun that is the force's objective.

According to Todd, in the original script his character lived and Taylor's character went back to his wife. However Todd requested that his character be killed.

Edmond O'Brien's character is relieved of command in a similarity to US Army Ranger Major Cleveland A Lytle. Lytle who was to command three companies of the 2nd Ranger Battalion in the assault at Pointe du Hoc heard that Free French sources reported the guns thought to be there had been removed. Lytle became quite vocal that the assault would be unnecessary and suicidal and was relieved of his command at the last minute by Provisional Ranger Force commander Colonel James Rudder. Rudder felt that Lytle could not convincingly lead a force with a mission that he did not believe in. Lytle was later transferred to the 90th Infantry Division where he was awarded the Distinguished Service Cross.

Technical adviser Colonel Dan Gilmer had been General Eisenhower's Secretary in SHAEF during the D-Day preparation and landings.
