= Lionel Shapiro =

Canadian journalist and novelist

- Born: February 12, 1908; Montreal, Quebec
- Died: May 27, 1958 (aged 50); Montreal, Quebec
- Occupation: Writer (novelist)
- Writing career
- Period: 20th century
- Genre: Historical fiction

Lionel Shapiro (February 12, 1908 – May 27, 1958) was a Canadian journalist and novelist. A war correspondent for The Montreal Gazette, he landed at the Allied invasion of Sicily, Salerno and Juno Beach on D-Day with the Canadian forces.

Shapiro was born in Montreal, Quebec, Canada, on February 12, 1908 to Samuel and Fanny Shapiro. His 1955 romantic novel The Sixth of June was awarded the Governor General's Award for English-language fiction, and was subsequently adapted into the Hollywood film D-Day the Sixth of June. His other novels include The Sealed Verdict and Torch For A Dark Journey. A McGill University Award is named after him for Creative Literature.

He died in Montréal on May 27, 1958, aged fifty.
